The given name "David" may refer to:

Medieval

Late antiquity to early medieval 
David was adopted as a Christian name from at least the 6th century.
David the Invincible (6th century), Neoplatonic philosopher
David (commentator) (6th century), Greek scholar
Saint David (6th century), patron saint of Wales
David the Dendrite (c. 450–540), a patron saint of Thessaloniki
David (son of Heraclius) (b. 630), co-emperor of Byzantium
David Saharuni (7th century), presiding prince of Byzantine-controlled Armenia
David ibn Merwan al-Mukkamas (d. 937), Arabic philosopher and controversialist, the author of the earliest known Jewish philosophical work of the Middle Ages
David I of Iberia (d. 881)
David II of Iberia (d. 937)
David of Bulgaria (d. 976), Bulgarian noble 
David III of Tao (d. 1000)

High medieval 
Saint David of Muscovy or Gleb (987–1015), brother of Saint Roman of Muscovy or Boris, and son of Saint Vladimir
David of Taman, late 10th century Khazar ruler
David (Da'ud), 11th-century ruler of the Seljuk Turks
David of Munktorp (died c. 1082)
David I of Scotland (d. 1153), Roman Catholic saint
David Kimhi (1160–1235), Medieval rabbi
David Mac Cerbaill (died 1289), English archbishop
David of Makuria (ruled c. 1268–1272), ruler of Makuria (in what is now Egypt and Sudan)
David Soslan (d. 1207), Georgian prince
Kings of Georgia:
David IV of Georgia (d. 1125)
David V of Georgia (d. 1155)
David VI of Georgia (d. 1293)
David VII of Georgia (d. 1270)
David VIII of Georgia (d. 1311)

Late medieval and early modern 
David, Lord of Brechin (d. 1320)
David II of Scotland (1324 – 22 February 1371)
Kings of Georgia:
David IX of Georgia (d. 1360)
David X of Kartli (d. 1526)
David XI of Kartli (d. 1579)
Davit as a name adopted by Emperors of Ethiopia:
David I or Dawit I of Ethiopia (1382 – 6 October 1413) 
David II or Dawit II of Ethiopia (1501 – September 2, 1540)
David III or Dawit III of Ethiopia (8 February 1716 – 18 May 1721)
David ben Solomon ibn Abi Zimra (1479–1573), Spanish Acharon 
David ben Solomon ibn Yahya (1455–1528), Spanish rabbi 
David ben Yom Tov ibn Bilia, Portuguese-Jewish philosopher  
David Bek (d. 1728), Armenian military commander
David Davidsz de Heem (1570–1632), Dutch painter 
David ibn Ya'ish (d. 1375), Spanish-Jewish writer
David Gwyn (fl. 1588), English poet
David Reubeni (1490–1535/1541?), Jewish political activist and mystic 
David Davidse Schuyler (1669–1715), American fur trader and politician
David Ungnad von Sonnegg (1535–1600), envoy of Maximilian II, Holy Roman Emperor

Modern

A
David Aaker (born 1938), American organizational theorist
David Aardsma (born 1981), American baseball player
David Abagna (born 1998), Ghanaian footballer
David Aaronovitch (born 1954), English journalist
David Abel (general) (1935–2019), Burmese economist
David Abel (cinematographer) (1883–1973), Russian-Dutch cinematographer
David T. Abercrombie (1867–1931), American outdoor expert and founder of Abercrombie & Fitch
David Abidor (born 1992), American soccer player
David Abioye, Nigerian author and preacher
David Abram (born 1957), American ecologist and philosopher
David Abrard (born 1976), French butterfly swimmer
David Manker Abshire (1926–2014), American civil servant and NATO representative
David Abulafia (born 1949), English historian
David Solomon Abwo (born 1986), Nigerian footballer
David Accam (born 1990), Ghanaian footballer
David J. Acer (1949–1990), American dentist
David Acfield (born 1947), English cricketer and fencer
David Campion Acheson (1921–2018), American attorney
David Ackles (1937–1999), American singer-songwriter
David Ackroyd (born 1940), American actor
David Acord, American sound editor
David Kpakpoe Acquaye (born 1928), Ghanaian academic
David Addington (born 1957), American lawyer
David I. Adelman (born 1964), American lawyer
David Adger (born 1967), English professor
David Adickes (born 1927), American modernist sculptor
David Adika (born 1970), Israeli photographer
David Adjaye (born 1966), Ghanaian-British architect
David Adjei (born 1977), Ghanaian footballer
David Adjey (born 1964), Canadian chef
David Adjmi (born 1973), American playwright
David E. Adkins, American businessman and politician
David Aebischer (born 1978), Swiss ice hockey player
David Aers (born 1946), English professor
David Affleck (1912–1984), Scottish footballer 
David Afkham (born 1983), German conductor
David Agard, American professor and physician
David Agmon (born 1947), Israeli commanding officer
David Agnew (president), Canadian academic administrator
David Álvarez Aguirre (born 1984), Spanish-Equatoguinean footballer
David V. Aguilar (born 1955), American civil servant
David Agus (born 1965), American physician and author
David Ahenakew (1933–2010), Canadian indigenous politician
David H. Ahl (born 1939), American magazine author
David Aikinhead (1566–1637), 17th-century Scottish lawyer
David M. Ainsworth (1954–2019), American politician
David Aja (born 1977), Spanish comic book artist
David Ajala (born 1986), English actor
David Ajang (born 1970), Nigerian prelate
David Ajiboye (born 1998), English footballer
David Akeman (1915–1973), American singer-songwriter
David Akers (born 1974), American football player
David Akers-Jones (1927–2019), British colonial administrator
David Bobihoe Akib (1955–2020), Indonesian civil servant
David Akiba (1940–2019), American photographer
David Akin, Canadian reporter
David Akui (1920–1987), American soldier
David Alaba (born 1992), Austrian footballer
David Albelda (born 1977), Spanish footballer
David Aldridge (born 1965), American sportswriter
David Alexanian (born 1967), American director and producer
David Alford (born 1964), American actor and playwright
David Almond (born 1951), British author
David Fernández Alonso (born 1996), Spanish handball player
David Alpay (born 1980), Canadian actor and musician
David Alter (1807–1881), American inventor
David Altmejd (born 1974), Canadian sculptor
David Alton (born 1951), English politician
David Alvey, American politician
David Alward (born 1959), Canadian politician
David Amaral (born 1950), American psychiatry professor
David Amber (born 1971), Canadian anchor
David Ambrose (born 1943), British novelist
David Amerson (born 1991), American football player
David Amess (1952–2021), English politician
David Amoo (born 1991), English footballer
David Amram (born 1930), American composer and conductor
David Ancrum (born 1958), American basketball player
David Andahl (1964–2020), American politician and rancher
David Anders (born 1981), American television actor
David Andersen (born 1980), Australian basketball player
David Andersen (goldsmith) (1843–1901), Norwegian goldsmith
David Anenih (born 1999), American football player
David Angell (1946–2001), American screenwriter and television producer
David A. Ansell (born 1952), Chicago-based physician
David M. Apatang, American politician
David Apotheker (1855–1911), Lithuanian humorist
David Applebaum (1952–2003), American-Israeli physician and rabbi
David Appleyard (born 1950), British academic
David Archard (born 1951), British philosopher
David Archuleta (born 1990), American singer
David Arellano (1901–1927), Chilean footballer
David Arenas, Colombian chess grandmaster
David Argyle, British veterinarian
David Arkenstone (born 1952), American composer
David Arkin (1941–1991), American actor
David Arkin (American football) (born 1987), American football player
David Armand (born 1977), English comedian
David Armstrong-Jones (born 1961), English furniture maker and member of the royal family
Davíð Arnar Ágústsson (born 1996), Icelandic basketball player
David Arnott (born 1963), American actor and screenwriter
David Whitehorn Arnott (1915–2004), British linguist
David Aronson (1923–2015), American painter
David Arora (born 1952), American mycologist
David Arquette (born 1971), American actor, director and producer
David Arseneault (born 1953), American basketball coach
David Arseneault Jr. (born 1986), American-Canadian basketball coach
David Arshakyan (born 1994), Armenian footballer
David Artell (born 1980), English footballer
David Arumugam (born 1950), Malaysian singer
David Asante (1834–1892), Ghanaian native missionary
David Asante-Apeatu (born 1957), Ghanaian forensic specialist
David Asheri (1925–2000), Italian-Israeli historian
David Åslin (born 1989), Swedish ice hockey player
David Asman (born 1954), American television news anchor
David Asper (born 1958), Canadian lawyer and businessman
David E. Aspnes (born 1939), American physicist
David Asscherick (born 1972), Australian pastor
David Assing (1787–1842), Prussian physicist and poet
David Aston (born 1953), New Zealand actor
David Atanga (born 1996), Ghanaian footballer
David Rice Atchison (1807–1886), American politician
David Manyok Barac Atem (1959–2021), South Sudanese military figure
David Atherton (baker) (born 1983), English baker
David Atrakchi (born 1977), Yugoslavian-American actor
David Attenborough (born 1926), English broadcaster and naturalist
David Attewell, (born 1974), English basketball player
David Atwell (born 1965), Canadian criminal
David Atwood (1815–1889), American politician and publisher
David Aubry (born 1996), French swimmer
David Auburn (born 1969), American playwright
David Aucagne (born 1973), French rugby union footballer
David B. Audretsch (born 1954), American economist
David Auerbach, American writer and software engineer
David Augsburger (born 1938), American author
David Auker, British film and television actor
David Aukin (born 1942), British theatrical and executive producer
David Aune (born 1939), American New Testament scholar
David Ausberry (born 1987), American football player
David Ausubel (1918–2008), American psychologist
David Autor (born 1967), American economist
David Avanesyan (born 1988), Russian boxer
David Avellan, American grappler and mixed martial artist
David Avery (born 1986), British film and television actor
David Avnir (born 1947), Israeli professor
David Avshalomov (born 1946), American classical composer
David Aworawo (born 1968), Nigerian professor
David Awschalom (born 1956), American physicist
David Axe, American military correspondent
David Axmark (born 1962), Swedish software developer
David Axon (1951–2012), English astrophysicist 
David Ayala (born 2002), Argentine footballer
David Ayer (born 1968), American filmmaker
David Ayrapetyan (born 1983), Armenian-Russian boxer 
David Ayres (born 1977), Canadian ice hockey player
David Azéma (born 1960), French businessman 
David Azin (born 1990), German-Armenian footballer 
David Azrieli (1922–2014), Canadian real estate tycoon
David Azulai (1954–2018), Israeli politician
David Azzi (born 1981), Lebanese-Canadian footballer

B
David Baan (1908–1984), Dutch lightweight boxer
David Baas (born 1981), American football player
David Baazov (1883–1947), Georgian religious figure
David Bada (born 1994), German American football player
David Baerwald (born 1960), American singer-songwriter
David Baev (born 1997), Russian wrestler
David Backes (born 1984), American ice hockey player
David Baddiel (born 1964), English comedian
David Bailie (1937–2021), South African actor
David Bakhtiari (born 1991), American football player
David Baldacci (born 1960), American novelist
David Bamber (born 1954), English actor
David Bamigboye (1940–2018), Nigerian military commander and politician
David Banner (born 1974), American rapper
David Bannon (born 1963), American criminal
David J. Bardin (born 1933), American government official
David Bargh (born 1962), New Zealand racing driver
David Barksdale (1947–1974), American gang leader
David Barnea (born 1965), Israeli intelligence officer
David Park Barnitz (1878–1901), American poet
David Barons (1936–2018), British horse trainer
David Bartov (1924–2018), Israeli judge
David Alan Basche (born 1968), American actor
David Basset (1687–1701), Merchant active in Newfoundland and New England
David Baszucki (born 1963), Canadian-American entrepreneur
David Le Batard (born 1972), American cartoon artist
David Bateson (born 1960), South African-English actor
David Batista (footballer) (born 1986), Brazilian footballer
David Batstone, American journalist
David Peter Battaglia (1931–2017), American politician
David Battley (1935–2003), British actor
David Batty (born 1968), English footballer
David Bavaro (born 1967), American football player
David Bawden (1959–2022), American conclavist claimant
David H. Bayley (1933–2020), American political scientist
David Bazan (born 1976), American singer-songwriter
David L. Bazelon (1909–1993), American judge
David Beaird (1952–2019), American director
David Beasley (born 1957), American politician and diplomat
David Beatson (1944–2017), New Zealand journalist
David W. Bebbington (born 1949), British historian
David Beckett (born 1954), English cricketer
David Beckham (born 1975), English footballer
David Bedein (born 1950), American community organizer
David Bedella (born 1962), American actor
David Bedford (1937–2011), English composer
David Beecroft (born 1955), American actor
David Begelman (1921–1995), American film producer
David Begnaud (born 1983), American journalist
David T. Beito (born 1956), American historian
David Bellamy (1933–2019), British author and environmental campaigner
David Bellavia (born 1975), American soldier
David Belle (born 1973), French founder of Parkour
David Bellon, American lieutenant general
David Bellotti (1943–2015), British politician
David Benavidez (born 1996), American-Mexican boxer
David Ben Dayan (born 1978), Israeli football player
David Bendeth (born 1954), English producer
David Ben-Gurion (1886–1973), Israeli politician and Prime Minister
David Benioff (born 1970), American writer
David Berkowitz (born 1953), American Satanic serial killer and arsonist
David Belasco (1853–1931), American theatrical producer
David Belove, American-Brazilian guitarist
David Benatar (born 1966), South African philosopher
David Refael ben Ami (1950–2020), Israeli singer
David Bender, American political activist and author
David Bennent (born 1966), Swiss actor
David G. Benner (born 1947), Canadian professor
David Berard (born 1970), American ice hockey coach
David Berenbaum, American screenwriter
David Berg (1919–1994), American religious figure
David Bergland (1935–2019), American politician
David Beriáin (1977–2021), Spanish journalist
David Berkowitz (disambiguation), several people
David Berlinski (born 1942), American author
David Bernhardt (born 1969), American politician and lobbyist
David Bernhardt (ice hockey) (born 1997), Swedish ice hockey player 
David Beukelman (born 1943), American speech-language pathologist
David Bevington (1931–2019), American literary scholar
David Bey (1957–2017), American boxer
David Beynon, Welsh rugby union footballer
David Beynon (teacher) (1919–1966), Welsh teacher
David Bezmozgis (born 1973), Canadian writer and filmmaker
David Bianculli, American TV critic and columnist
David Bianchi, American-Brazilian actor
David Bickler (born 1953), American musician
David Biddle (born 1985), Canadian rugby union footballer
David Bieber (born 1966), American convicted murderer
David Bierk (1944–2002), Canadian-American painter
David Binder (1931–2019), English-American journalist
David Bing (born 1943), American basketball player and politician
David Binn (born 1972), American football player
David Binney (born 1961), American saxophonist
David Birkin (born 1977), British artist
David Bird (journalist) (c. 1959–2014), American journalist
David Birney (1939–2022), American actor
David Biro (born 1964), American physician and writer
David Bisbal (born 1979), Spanish singer-songwriter
David Bischoff (1951–2018), American writer
David F. Bjorklund (born 1949), American professor
David Theodore Blaauw, American professor
David Blackbourn (born 1949), English professor
David Blackwell (1919–2010), American mathematician
David Blaine (born 1973), American illusionist
David Blatner (born 1966), American writer and speaker
David Blatt (born 1959), Israeli-American basketball player and coach
David B. Bleak (1932–2006), American soldier
David Bleakley (1925–2017), Northern Irish politician
David Bleakley (cricketer) (1817–1992), English cricketer
David Blech (born 1955), American businessman
David Blei, American professor
David W. Blight (born 1949), American professor
David Blitz, American philosophy teacher
David S. Blitzer (born 1969), American businessman and sports owner
David Blixt (born 1973), American author
David Blocker (born 1955), American film producer
David Bloom (1963–2003), American television journalist
David Bloor (born 1942), British sociologist
David Blough (born 1995), American football player
David Blu (born 1980), Israeli-American basketball player
David Blume, American permaculture teacher
David Blumenthal (born 1948), American health care policy expert
David Blunkett (born 1947), British politician
David Boat (born 1959), American voice actor
David Sarpong Boateng (1943–c. 2016), Ghanaian politician
David Boaz (born 1953), American executive and author
David Bobin (1945–2017), English sports journalist
David Bodanis (born 1950), American speaker and advisor
David Bodian (1910–1992), American medical scientist
David Boe (1936–2020), American organist
David Bohm (1917–1992), American scientist
David Boies (born 1941), American lawyer
David Bolstad (1969–2011), New Zealand woodchopper
David Bomberg (1980–1957), British painter
David Bonderman (born 1942), American businessman
David Bonetti (1947–2018), American art critic
David Bonior (born 1945), American politician
David Booker (born 1954), Australian sculptor
David Boon (born 1960), Australian cricket umpire
David Boreanaz (born 1969), American actor
David Borrero (born 1988), American politician
David Borwein (1924–2021), Canadian mathematician
David Bossie (born 1965), American political activist
David Bostock (1948–2016), British diplomat
David Bostock (philosopher) (1936–2019), British philosopher
David Boston (born 1978), American football player
David Bote (born 1993), American baseball player
David Dean Bottrell (born 1959), American actor and comedian
David Boudia (born 1989), American diver
David Boui (born 1988), Central African taekwondo practitioner
David Bouley (born 1953), American chef and restaurateur
David Renaud Boullier (1699–1759), Dutch philosopher and minister
David Bowens (born 1977), American football player
David Bowie (1947–2016), British singer-songwriter
David Box (1943–1964), American rock musician
David A. Boxley (born 1952), American artist
David Braben (born 1964), British video game developer
David Brabham (born 1965), Australian racing driver
David Brain (born 1964), Zimbabwean cricketer
David Brainerd (1718–1747), American missionary
David Braley (1941–2020), Canadian businessman and politician
David Brancaccio (born 1960), American radio journalist
David Branch (fighter) (born 1981), American mixed martial artist
David Brant, American special agent
David Braybrooke (1924–2013), American political philosopher
David Brearley (1741–1790), American judge
David Breashears (born 1955), American mountaineer and filmmaker
David Breda (born 1971), Czech footballer
David S. Bredt, American molecular neuroscientist
David Brekalo (born 1998), Slovenian footballer
David A. Brennen, American lawyer
David Brenner (1936–2014), American comedian and actor
David A. Brent, American psychiatrist
David Andrew Brent (born 1981), Canadian actor
David Brewster (1781–1868), British scientist
David Brian (1914–1993), American actor
David Brickett (born 1950), South African cricketer
David Brickner (born 1958), American Baptist minister
David Bridges (born 1982), English footballer
David Brierly (1935–2008), English actor
David Brillembourg (1942–1993), Venezuelan economist
David Brin (born 1950), American scientist and author
David Brinkley (1920–2003), American newscaster
David Brits (born 1997), South African rugby union footballer
David Brock (born 1962), American political consultant
David S. Broder (1929–2011), American political commentator
David C. Broderick (1820–1859), American attorney and politician
David Broecker (born 1961), American executive
David Brog (born 1966), American attorney
David Broll (born 1993), Canadian ice hockey player
David Brom (born 1971), American mass murderer
David Bromberg (born 1945), American singer-songwriter
David Bromstad (born 1973), American television personality
David Broncano (born 1984), Spanish comedian
David J. Bronczek (born 1954), American businessman
David Bronstein (1924–2006), Soviet chess player
David Broockman, American political scientist
David Brooks (1955–2020), multiple people
David Brower (1912–2000), American environmentalist
David Brown, multiple people
David Broza (born 1955), Israeli singer-songwriter
David Brubeck (1920–2012), American jazz pianist and composer
David K. E. Bruce (1898–1977), American diplomat, intelligence officer and politician
David Brumbaugh (1960–2017), American businessman and politician
David Bryan (born 1962), American singer-songwriter
David Brydon (born 1996), New Zealand field hockey player
David Byrne (Irish criminal) (died 2016), Irish criminal
David Buchsbaum (1929–2021), American mathematician
David Buck (1936–1989), English actor
David Buckel (1957–2018), American lawyer
David Buckley (born 1976), British composer
David P. Buckson (1920–2017), American lawyer and politician
David Budbill (1940–2016), American poet and playwright
David Buehler (born 1987), American football player
David Buffett (born 1942), American political figure
David Buggy (born 1975), Irish hurler
David Godoy Bugueño (1944–2007), Chilean chess player
David Bullard (born 1952), South African columnist
David Bullard (politician), American politician
David Bullock (entrepreneur) (born 1993), American entrepreneur
David Bulow (1980–2021), American soccer player
David R. Bunch (1925–2000), American writer
David Bunevacz (born 1968), Filipino-American businessman and model
David Burkette, American politician
David Burks (born 1943), American academic president
David Burnford (1915–1984), British doctor and rower 
David Burnham (born 1933), American journalist
David Burnside (born 1951), Northern Irish politician
David Burnside (footballer) (1939–2009), English footballer
David Burritt (born 1955), American businessman
David Burtka (born 1975), American actor and chef
David D. Busch (born 1947), American photographer
David Buskin (born 1943), American singer-songwriter
David Busst (born 1967), English football manager
David Bustamante (born 1982), Spanish singer-songwriter
David Byas (born 1963), English first-class cricketer 
David Byerman, American politician 
David Bystroň (1982–2017), Czech footballer
David Byrne (born 1952), Scottish-American musician

C
David Cabán (born 1993), Puerto Rican soccer player
David Caesar (born 1963), Australian television director
David Cage (born 1969), French video game designer
David Calderisi (born 1940), Canadian actor
David Cale, English-American playwright
David Call (born 1982), American actor
David Callaham (born 1977), American screenwriter
David Callahan (born 1964/1965), American writer and editor
David Callister (1935–2020), Manx politician and broadcaster
David Camm, American state trooper
David Campagna (1946–2017), American actor
David Canary (1938–2015), American actor
David Caneda (born 1970), Spanish footballer and manager
David Cannadine (born 1950), British author and historian
David Canter (born 1944), English psychologist
David Capel (1963–2020), English cricketer
David Caplan (1964–2019), Canadian politician
David Cárcamo (born 1970), Honduran footballer
David Cardwell, British engineer
David Cardwell (civil servant) (1920–1982), British civil servant
David Carney (born 1983), Australian footballer
David Caron (1952–2018), American professor
David Carradine (1936–2009), American actor
David Carrasco (born 1944), American academic historian
David Carreira (born 1991), Portuguese singer
David Carritt (1927–1982), British art historian, dealer and critic
David Carroll, multiple people
David Caruso (born 1956), American actor
David Casas (born 1971), American politician
David Casasnovas (born 1979), Spanish footballer
David Casassas (born 1975), Spanish academic
David Caspe (born 1978), American film and television writer
David Cassidy (1950–2017), American singer-songwriter
David Castañeda (born 1989), Mexican-American actor
David Castilla (born 1977), French footballer
David Castro (born 1996), American actor
David Castro (swimmer) (born 1964), Head of the Cross Fit Company 
David Catania (born 1968), American politician and lawyer
David Catling, American professor
David Catrow (born 1952), American artist and illustrator
David Cavanagh (1964–2018), Irish writer
David Cavazos (born 1985), Mexican singer-songwriter
David Caves (born 1979), Northern Irish actor
David Celermajer (born 1961), Australian cardiologist
David Celia (born 1973), Canadian singler-songwriter
David Cerda (born 1961), American playwright
David Černý (born 1967), Czech sculptor
David Cerullo (born 1952), American televangelist
David Cervinski (1970–2019), Australian footballer
David Cesarani (1956–2015), British historian
David Cesarini, American economist
David Chalian (born 1973), American journalist
David Chalmers (born 1966), Australian philosopher
David Charlesworth (born 1951), English Catholic abbot
David Chartrand (born 1960), Canadian politician and activist 
David Charvet (born 1972), French actor and model
David Chase (born 1945), American screenwriter
David Chaussinand (born 1973), French hammer thrower
David Chaum (born 1955), American computer scientist
David Cheng (born 1989), American racing driver
David K. Cheng (1918–2012), Chinese professor and electrical engineer
David Cheriton (born 1951), Canadian computer scientist
David A. Cherry (born 1949), American artist
David Chesky (born 1956), American pianist
David Chesnoff (born 1955), American attorney
David Chesworth (born 1958), English-Australian composer
David Abraham Cheulkar (1909–1981), Indian actor
David Chiang (born 1947), Hong Kong actor
David Chibana (born 1993), Japanese kickboxer
David Hatcher Childress (born 1957), American author
David Childs (born 1941), American architect
David Chilton (1951–1997), American pastor
David Chilton (businessman) (born 1961), Canadian author and investor
David Chingunji (1945–1970), Angolan politician
David Chipman, American law enforcement officer
David Chipperfield (born 1953), English architect
David Chisum (born 1970), American actor
David Chiu, several people
David Choby (1947–2017), American prelate
David Chocarro (born 1980), Argentine baseball player and model
David Chodounsky (born 1984), American alpine skier
David Choe (born 1976), American artist
David Choi (born 1986), American musician
David Chokachi (born 1968), American actor
David Chong, Singaporean lawyer
David Choquehuanca (born 1961), Bolivian politician
David A. Christian (born 1948), United States Army captain 
David Chu, several people
David Cicilline (born 1961), American politician
David Cienciala (born 1995), Czech ice hockey player
David Ciente (born 1989), Romanian composer and producer
David Xavier Cifu (born 1962), American physiatrist
David Civera (born 1979), Spanish singer
David Claessen (born 1959), Dutch cinematographer
David Clayton-Thomas (born 1941), Canadian singer-songwriter
David I. Cleland (1926–2018), American engineer
David Clement-Davies (born 1964), British author and sculptor
David Judson Clemmons, American musician
David Clendenin (1790–1817), American soldier and politician
David Ramsay Clendenin (1830–1895), American teacher and soldier
David Clendon (born 1955), New Zealand politician
David Clennon (born 1943), American actor
David Clewell (1955–2020), American poet and writer
David Cliche (1952–2020), Canadian politician
David Clifford (born 1999), Irish Gaelic footballer
David Climenhaga (born 1952), Canadian blogger and union activist
David Climer (1953–2020), American sports reporter
David Cliss (born 1939), English footballer
David Clohessy, American spokesman
David Cloke (born 1955), Australian rules footballer
David Clopton (1820–1892), American politician
David Clowney (born 1985), American football player
David Cloyd (born 1974), American singer-songwriter
David Cluett (1965–2005), Maltese footballer
David Clyde (born 1955), American baseball player
David T. Clydesdale (born 1954), American musical artist
David H. Coar (born 1943), American judge
David Cobham (1930–2018), British producer
David Coffin, American folk musician
David Cohn (born 1995), Israeli-American basketball player
David X. Cohen (born 1966) American television writer 
David Colander (born 1947), American economist
David Coldrick, Gaelic football referee
David Čolina (born 2000), Croatian footballer
David Collings (1940–2020), English actor
David Collins (interior designer) (1955–2013), Irish architect 
David Colmer (born 1960), Australian writer and translator
David Colston, American politician
David Coltart (born 1957), Zimbabwean lawyer
David Combe (1943–2019), Australian politician
David Cone (born 1963), American baseball player and color commentator
David Conrad (born 1967), American actor
David Consuegra (1939–2004), Colombian graphic designer
David Consunji (1921–2017), Filipino businessman
David P. Cooley (1960–2009), American test pilot
David Copeland (footballer) (1875–1931), English footballer
David Y. Copeland III (1931–2019), American politician
David Cordani (born 1966), American business executive
David Corenswet (born 1993), American actor
David Corfield, British philosopher
David Corkery (born 1972), Irish rugby union footballer
David Corkill (born 1960), British lawn bowler
David Corley Jr. (born 1980), American football player and coach
David Cormand (born 1974), French politician
David Cormican (born 1981), Canadian television executive
David Corn (born 1959), American political journalist
David Cornell (born 1991), Welsh footballer
David Cornstein (born 1938), American politician and diplomat
David Coromina (born 1974), Spanish footballer
David Barron Corona (1963–1997), Mexican gangster
David Corrêa (1937–2020), Brazilian singer-songwriter
David Correia, American scholar and activist
David Corwin, American psychiatrist
David Costabile (born 1967), American actor
David Costas (born 1995), Spanish footballer
David Côté (politician) (1915–1969), Canadian politician
David Côté (Canadian football) (born 1996), Canadian football player
David Cotton (born 1950/1951), American businessman
David Cotton (ice hockey) (born 1997), American ice hockey player
David Coulthard (born 1971), Scottish Formula One racer
David Coverdale (born 1951), British vocalist
David Crabb (born 1975), American actor
David Crabtree, American television anchor
David Cracknell, British journalist
David Craighead (organist) (1924–2012), American organist
David Crellin (born 1961), English actor
David Cretney (born 1954), Manx politician and entrepreneur
David Crighton (1942–2000), British mathematician
David Crisafulli (born 1979), Australian politician
David Crocker (born 1937), American professor
David Crockett (wrestling) (born 1946), American pro wrestling announcer
David Crombie (born 1936), Canadian politician
David Cromer (born 1964), American theatre director
David Cromwell (born 1962), British oceanographer
David Cronenberg (born 1943), Canadian film director
David Moore Crook (1914–1944), British fighter pilot 
David Crouch (historian) (born 1953), Welsh historian and academic
David Croudip (1958–1988), American football player
David Crouse (born 1971), American writer and teacher
David Crowder (born 1971), American Christian rock singer
David H. Crowley (1882–1951), American politician
David Cryer (born 1936), American actor and singer
David Crystal (born 1941), British linguist
David Cubitt (born 1965), English-Canadian actor
David Cuddy (born 1952), American politician and businessman
David Culley (born 1955), American football coach
David Culver (1924–2017), Canadian businessman
David Cunliffe (born 1963), New Zealand politician
David Curry (born 1944), British politician 
David Curson (born 1948), American politician
David Custer (born 1980), American journalist and news anchor
David Cutcliffe (born 1954), American football coach
David Cutler (born 1965), American economist and professor
David Cynamon (born 1963), Canadian executive and sports owner
David Cyrus (born 1989), Grenadian footballer
David Czyszczon (born 1981), Polish-German footballer

D
David Dabydeen (born 1955), Guyanese-English novelist and diplomat
David Dacko (1930–2003), Central African politician
David Dale (1739–1806), Scottish industrialist
David Kenneth Hay Dale (1927–2001), British colonial administrator
David Daleiden (born 1989), American anti-abortion activist
David Dalglish (born 1984), American writer
David Dallas (born 1982), New Zealand artist
David Damrosch (born 1953), American historian
David Damschen, American politician
David d'Angers (1788–1856), French sculptor
David Danielson (1947–2021), American politician
David Danzmayr (born 1980), Austrian conductor
David Darcy (1943–2020), Australian rules footballer
David Darom (1943–2021), Israeli marine biologist
David Dastmalchian (born 1977), American actor
David Datuna (born 1974), Georgian-American artist
David Daughtry (born 1975), American gospel musician
David Davidar (born 1958), Indian novelist and publisher
David David-Weill (1871–1952), French-American banker
David Davidyan (born 1997), Russian-Armenian footballer
David Dawood (born 1981), English disc jockey and songwriter
David DeCastro (born 1990), American football player
David DeCoteau (born 1962), American-Canadian director
David Defiagbon (1970–2018), Nigerian boxer
David de Gea (born 1990), Spanish footballer
David Degtyarev (born 1996), Kazakhstani Paralympic powerlifter
David Deida (born 1958), American author
David Dein (born 1943), English sports owner and executive
David DeJesus (born 1979), American baseball player
David de Keyser (1927–2021), English actor
David Dekker (born 1998), Dutch cyclist
David Della Rocco (born 1952), American comedian
David Dellinger (1915–2004), American activist and writer
David Dellucci (born 1973), American baseball player
David Del Rio (born 1987), American actor
David DeLuise (born 1971), American actor
David DeMille, American physicist
David Deming (born 1954), American geologist
David Deming (economist), American economist
David Denman (born 1973), American actor
David Denning, British epidemiologist
David Denson (born 1995), American baseball player
David H. DePatie (1929–2021), American producer
David Depetris (born 1988), Argentine-Slovak footballer
David Deptula (born 1952), American Lieutenant General
David Desrosiers (born 1980), Canadian musician
David Deutsch (born 1953), British physicist
David Devant (1868–1941), English magician
David Dewey (born 1956), American painter
David Dewhurst (born 1945), American politician and businessman
David DeWitt (born 1948), American computer scientist
David Dhawan (born 1955), Indian film director
David Diamante (born 1971), American ring announcer
David DiChiera (1935–2018), American composer
David Dickey (born 1945), American statistician
David Diehl (born 1980), American football player
David DiFrancesco (born 1949), American inventor
David Dillehunt (born 1984), American film director and television producer
David L. Dill (born 1957), American computer scientist
David Dillon (born 1951), American business executive
David Dimbleby (born 1938), British TV commentator
David Dinkins (1927–2020), American politician
David Diop (1927–1960), French poet
David Diop (novelist) (born 1966), French novelist
David Diosa (born 1992), Colombian footballer
David DiPietro (born 1960), American politician
David Diringer (1900–1975), British linguist
David Doak (born 1967), Northern Irish video game designer
David Dobrik (born 1996), Slovak-American YouTube personality
David Dockery (born 1952), American religious and educational figure
David S. Dodge (1922–2009), American politician
David Dolan (born 1979), English boxer
David Dolan (pianist) (born 1955), Israeli pianist
David Doman, American electrical engineer
David Domgjoni (born 1997), Kosovan footballer 
David Domina (born 1950), American lawyer and politician
David Dondero (born 1969), American singer-songwriter
David D'Or (born 1965), Israeli singer
David H. Dornsife (born 1944), American businessman
David Doster (born 1970), American baseball player
David Doubilet (born 1956), American photographer
David Dougherty (1967–2017), New Zealand convicted criminal
David Douillet (born 1969), French judo athlete
David B. Douthett (1840–1927), American politician
David Dowdy, American epidemiologist
David Dowell, American scientist
David Dowler (born 1967), American serial killer
David Dozier (born 1949), American professor
David Drábek (born 1970), Czech playwright
David Dragojević (born 1988), Serbian footballer
David Dragunsky (1910–1992), Soviet officer
David Draiman (born 1973), American singer-songwriter
David Draper (1942–2021), American bodybuilder
David Drasin (born 1940), American mathematician
David Dreier (born 1952), American entrepreneur
David Dreman (born 1936), Canadian investor
David Dreshaj (born 1999), Albanian singer
David Dreyer, American politician
David Driskell (1931–2020), American artist
David Driver (born 1962), American singer-songwriter
David Droga (born 1968), Australian executive
David M. Dror, American health specialist 
David Drumm (born 1966), Irish accountant and banker
David Drysdale (born 1975), Scottish golfer
David Duarte (born 1995), Brazilian footballer
David Dubinsky (1892–1982), American labor leader
David Duchovny (born 1960), American actor
David Duffield (born 1941), American businessman
David W. Dugan (born 1960), American judge
David Dukes (1945–2000), American actor
David Kojo Duku (1920–??), Ghanaian politician
David du Plessis (1905–1987), South African minister
David Đurak (born 2000), Slovenian footballer
David Durand (1680–1763), English minister
David Durand (actor) (1920–1998), American actor
David Durenberger (1934–2023), American politician
David Dushman (1923–2021), Russian soldier
David Duval (born 1971), American golfer
David Dvořáček (born 1992), Czech ice hockey player 
David Dworkin (born 1934), American musician
David Dwyer (born 1964), Australian rules footballer
David Dyzenhaus, Canadian jurist and law professor
David Dzakhov (born 1988), Russian footballer 
David Dziobkowski, American officer 
David Dziurzynski (born 1989), Canadian hockey player

E
David Eades, British journalist
David Eady (born 1943), British judge 
David Eagleman (born 1971), American neuroscientist
David Eagles (born 1935), British test pilot
David Eaglin, American air force general
David Easter (born 1959), English actor 
David Eastman (born 1945), Australian public servant
David Easton (1917–2014), Canadian-American political scientist
David Eastwood (born 1959), British academic 
David Ebershoff (born 1969), American writer
David Ebersman (born 1969), American businessman
David Ebo (1950–1993), American singer
David Eby (born 1977), Canadian lawyer and politician
David Eckstein (born 1975), American baseball player
David Eddings (1931–2009), American fantasy writer
David Edgerton (1927–2018), American entrepreneur
David Edgerton (historian) (born 1959), English historian and professor
David Effron, American conductor
David Egan (1954–2016), American singer-songwriter
David Egan (jockey) (born 1999), Irish jockey
David Egbo (born 1998), Nigerian footballer
David Egerton (1961–2021), English rugby union footballer
David Egerton (British Army officer) (1914–2010), British army officer
David Ehrenfeld (born 1938), American professor
David Ehrenstein (born 1947), American film critic
David J. Eicher (born 1961), American editor and writer
David Eick (born 1968), American writer
David Eigenberg (born 1964), American actor
David Eisenbach, American historian
David Eisenbud (born 1947), American mathematician
David Eisenhower (born 1948), American author and professor
David Glen Eisley (born 1952), American singer-songwriter
David Ejoor (1932–2019), Nigerian army officer
David Eldon (born 1945), former chairman of The Hongkong and Shanghai Banking Corporation Limited
David Ellefson (born 1964), American musician
David Romero Ellner (??–2020), Honduran journalist
David Emerson (born 1945), Canadian politician
David Emerson (cricketer) (born 1961), American cricketer
David F. Emery (born 1948), American politician
David Emge (born 1946), American actor
David Emslie (born 1955), South African cricketer
David England (born 1956), Australian rower
David Enoch (1901–1949), Israeli chess player
David Enoch (philosopher), British philosopher
David Enrich (born 1979), American journalist
David Eppstein (born 1963), American computer scientist
David Epston (born 1944), New Zealand therapist
David Erskine (1???–1611)
David Esquer (born 1965), American baseball coach
David Essex (born 1947), English singer-songwriter
David Esterly (1944–2019), American sculptor
David Eto'o (born 1987), Cameroonian footballer
David Estudillo (born 1973/1974), American judge
David L. Eubanks (born 1935), American preacher
David Evangelista (born 1968), American fashion contributor
David Everett (1770–1813), American newspaper editor
David M. Ewalt (born 1976), American journalist
David Eyges (born 1950), American cellist
David Eyres (born 1964), English footballer

F
David Fa'alogo (born 1980), New Zealand rugby league footballer 
David Fabricius (1564–1617), German pastor
David Fagen (1875–1???), African-American soldier
David Fahm, Zambian-British actor
David Fahrenthold (born 1978), American journalist
David Fair (born 1952), American activist
David Fairchild (1869–1954), American botanist
David Fairhurst (1906–1972), English footballer
David Faitelson (born 1968), Israeli-Mexican journalist
David Fajgenbaum (born 1985), American author
David Fales (born 1990), American football player
David Falk (born 1950), American sports agent
David Fall (1902–1964), American diver
David Fane (born 1966), New Zealand actor
David Farabee (born 1964), American politician
David Farinango (born 2000), Ecuadorian swimmer
David Farr (born 1955), American business executive
David Farragut (1801–1870), American naval officer
David Farrant (born 1960), New Zealand cricketer
David P. Farrington (born 1944), British criminologist
David Farrier (born 1982), New Zealand journalist
David Fasenfest (born 1949), American sociologist
David Fasold (1939–1998), American marine officer
David Faustino (born 1974), American actor
David Feao (born 1990), Tongan rugby union footballer
David FeBland, American artist
David Fechheimer (1942–2019), American private investigator
David Fedderly (born 1953), American tuba player
David Feeney (born 1970), Australian politician
David Feffer (born 1956), Brazilian businessman
David Feherty (born 1958), British golfer
David B. Fein (born 1960), American attorney
David Sidney Feingold (1922–2019), American biochemist
David Feiss (born 1959), American animator
David Feldberg (born 1977), American golfer
David Felder (born 1953), American composer
David L. Felten (born 1948), American neuroscientist
David Fenech (born 1969), French musician
David Fenton (born 1953), American businessman
David Fergusson (1944–2018), New Zealand psychologist
David Fernley (1934–2009), South African cricketer
David Ferrant (born 1963), South African cricketer
David Ferreira (born 1979), Colombian footballer
David Ferrer (born 1982), Spanish tennis player
David Ferrie (1918–1967), American pilot
David Ferrucci, American academic researcher
David Feuerwerker (1912–1980), French rabbi
David Ffrangcon-Davies (1855–1918), Welsh baritone opera singer
David Fieldhouse (1925–2018), English historian
David Fielding (born 1955), American politician
David Fierro, American actor
David Fifita (rugby league, born 1989), Tongan rugby league footballer
David Fifita (rugby league, born 2000), Australian rugby league footballer
David Figlio (born 1970), American economist
David Filo (born 1966), American businessman
David Fincher (born 1962), film director
David George Findlay (1913–1982), Surinamese politician
David Finkelhor (born 1947), American sociologist
David Finkelstein (1929–2016), American physician and professor
David Firman, British conductor
David First (born 1953), American composer
David Firth (born 1983), English animator
David Fischerov (born 1998), Austrian weightlifter
David Fiske, American author
David Fisman, Canadian health professor
David Fithian (born 1964), American academic executive
David Fiuczynski (born 1964), American jazz guitarist
David Fizdale (born 1974), American basketball coach
David Flair (born 1979), American wrestler
David Flaschen (born 1951), American soccer player
David Flatman (born 1980), English rugby union footballer
David Flavius (born 1972), Saint Lucian footballer
David Fleay (1907–1993), Australian naturalist
David Fleet (born 1954), Canadian politician
David Fleischaker (born 1944), American businessman
David Flex (born 1987), American wrestler
David Flint (born 1938), Australian academic
David Flockhart (1952–2015), Scottish medical researcher
David Flood (born 1969), Australian rules footballer
David Flood (organist), British organist
David Floyd (born 1951), American politician
David Fluellen (born 1992), American football player
David Flusfeder (born 1960), American-British author
David Flusser (1917–2000), Israeli professor
David Foenkinos (born 1974), French author
David B. Fogel (born 1964), American computer engineer
David Folkenflik (born 1969), American reporter
David Folsom (born 1947), American judge
David Fonseca (born 1973), Portuguese musician
David Fontana (1934–2010), British psychologist
David Foot, Canadian demographer
David Foot (journalist) (1929–2021), British journalist
David Forden (1930–2019), American intelligence officer
David Foreman (1946–2022), American environmentalist and author
David Forman, English entrepreneur and stuntman
David Forman (general) (1745–1797), American general
David Forsberg, American politician
David Forst (born 1976), American baseball executive
David Foucault (born 1989), Canadian gridiron football player
David J. Foulis (1930–2018), American mathematician
David Foxon (1923–2001), English bibliographer
David Frakes (born 1976), American engineer
David J. R. Frakt, American lawyer and officer
David Fralick (born 1962), American actor
David A. Frank-Kamenetskii (1910–1970), Soviet physicist
David Frankfurter (1909–1982), Croatian Jew
David Frankham (born 1926), English actor
David Fraser-Hidalgo (born 1969), Ecuadorian-American politician
David Frawley (born 1950), American Hindu teacher
David Fray (born 1981), French pianist
David Frazee, Canadian cinematographer
David Frederick (born 1961), American attorney 
David Freese (born 1983), American baseball player
David Freiberg (born 1938), American musician
David Freiheit (born 1979), Canadian YouTuber
David Freitas (born 1989), American baseball player
David Freud (born 1950), British politician
David Fricke (born 1952), American music journalist
David Fried (born 1962), American artist
David Friedrichsfeld (1755–1810), German-Jewish writer
David Fries, American scientist
David Friesen (born 1942), American bassist
David Friess (born 1968/1969), American politician
David Frigerio (born 1970), American screenwriter
David Friio (born 1973), French footballer
David Frith (born 1937), British sports writer and historian
David Frizzell (born 1941), American singer
David Frockt (born 1969), American politician
David B. Frohnmayer (1940–2015), American attorney
David Froman (1938–2010), American actor
David Fromkin (1932–2017), American author
David Frost (1939–2013), British television host
David Frum (born 1960), Canadian-American political writer
David Frye (1933–2011), American comedian
David Fubini, American professor
David Fuhrer (born 1960), American entrepreneur
David Fulcher (born 1964), American football player
David Füleki (born 1985), German comic artist 
David Fuller (born 1954), British murderer and necrophile
David Fumero (born 1972), Cuban-American actor
David Fung (born 1983), Canadian pianist
David D. Furman (1917–2008), American lawyer and judge
David Furness, American military officer
David Furnish (born 1962), Canadian filmmaker
David Furr, American actor
David Fury (born 1959), American television writer
David Fusitu'a (born 1994), New Zealand rugby league footballer
David Fuster (born 1982), Spanish footballer
David Fynn, British-Irish actor

G
David Gadsby (1947–2019), British physiologist
David Gagen (born 1953), English speedway racer
David Gahan (born 1962), English singer-songwriter
David Gaider (born 1971), Canadian writer
David Gaither (born 1957), American politician
David Galenson (born 1951), American professor
David A. Gall (1941–2021), Canadian jockey
David Gallagher (born 1985), American actor
David Gallegos, American politician
David Gallo (born 1966), American scenic designer
David H. Gambrell (1929–2021), American attorney and politician
David R. Gamperl (born 1966), American businessman
David Gandy (born 1980), English fashion model
David Gans (1541–1613), German author
David Gans (musician) (born 1953), American musician
David Gant (born 1943), Scottish actor
David F. Gantt (1941–2020), American politician
David Garman (1922–2019), British businessman and inventor
David Garrard (born 1978), American football player
David Garrett (born 1980), German violinist
David Garrick (1717–1779), English actor
David Garrison (born 1952), American actor
David Garnett (1892–1981), British writer and publisher
David Gasman (born 1960), American actor and director
David Gates (born 1940), American singer-songwriter
David Gaudu (born 1996), French cyclist
David Gaughran, Irish writer
David Gauke (born 1971), British politician
David Gaunt (born 1944), British professor
David Gauthier (born 1932), Canadian-American philosopher
David Gautreaux (born 1951), American actor
David Geddis (born 1958), English football coach
David Gedge (born 1960), English musician
David Geffen (born 1943), American business magnate 
David Geiser (1947–2020), American painter
David Gelb (born 1983), American director
David Gelbaum (1950–2018), American businessman
David Gelernter (born 1955), American computer scientist
David Geller, American professor and surgeon
David Gelston (1744–1828), American merchant and politician
David Gemmell (1948–2006), British author
David Geovanis, Russian-American businessman
David Gergen (born 1942), American political commentator
David Gerrold (born 1944), American science fiction writer
David Gessner (born 1961), American essayist
David Gest (1953–2016), American TV producer
David Ghazaryan (1989–2020), Armenian general
David Giffin (born 1973), Australian rugby union footballer
David Gilhooly (1943–2013), American ceramicist
David Gilliland (born 1976), American stock car racing driver
David Gillingham (born 1947), American composer
David Gilmour (born 1946), British rock singer-songwriter
David R. Gilmour (born 1958), American diplomat
David Gilreath (born 1988), American football player
David Ginger, American physical chemist
David J. Gingery (1932–2004), American inventor
David Ginola (born 1967), French footballer
David Giralt (1959–2020), Cuban long-jumper
David R. Giroux (born 1975), American equity manager
David Gistau (1970–2020), Spanish journalist
David Giuntoli (born 1980), American actor
David Givens (born 1980), American football player
David Glantz (born 1942), American historian
David Glasner, American economist
David Glawe (born 1970), American civil servant
David Gleeson (born 1966), Irish film director
David Gleeson (golfer) (born 1978), Australian golfer
David Gleirscher (born 1994), Austrian luger
David Gockley (born 1943), American opera administrator
David C. Godbey (born 1957), American judge
David Godman (born 1953), British Hindu professor
David Goel (born 1970), American hedge fund manager
David Goffin (born 1990), Belgian tennis player
David Goforth (born 1988), American baseball player
David L. Goldfein (born 1959), American general
David Goggins (born 1975), American runner
David Gogokhia (born 1987), Georgian visual artist
David Goldblatt (1930–2018), South African photographer
David Goldblatt (writer) (born 1965), British sports writer
David Lionel Goldsmid-Stern-Salomons (1851–1925), British author and baronet
David Golomb (1933–2019), Israeli politician
David Gomberg (born 1953), American businessman and politician
David Gompert (born 1945), American government official and diplomat
David Gonzales (cartoonist) (born 1964), American cartoonist
David Good (driver) (1933–2017), British hillclimber
David Gooderson (born 1941), English actor
David Willoughby Gooding (1925–2019), British professor
David Goodis (1917–1967), American writer
David Goodwillie (born 1989), Scottish footballer
David Goodwillie (author) (born 1972), American novelist
David Goodwin (born 1992), American ice hockey player
David Gossett (born 1979), American golfer
David Gottesman (1926–2022), American businessman
David Gough (born 1983), Gaelic football referee
David Gove (1978–2017), American ice hockey player
David Goverde (born 1970), Canadian ice hockey player
David Gowan, American politician
David Gower (born 1957), English cricketer
David Gower (rugby league) (born 1985), Australian rugby league footballer
David S. Goyer (born 1965), American filmmaker
David Gracie (1927–2020), British hurdler
David Graeber (1961–2020), American anthropologist
David Graf (1950–2001), American actor
David Grainger (born 1966), British venture capitalist
David Grainger (presenter), American businessman and presenter
David Grann (born 1967), American journalist 
David Gravel (born 1992), American racing driver
David Greaves (1946–2019), English snooker player
David Greczek (born 1994), American soccer player
David Greenwood (born 1957), American basketball player
David Greetham (born 1975), English cricketer
David Greetham (1941–2020), American literary critic
David Greilsammer (born 1977), Israeli painter
David Grellier (born 1979), French musician
David Grene (1913–2002), American professor
David Gresham (born 1943), South African record producer
David Grewe (born 1976), American baseball coach
David Gribble (born 1946), Australian cinematographer
David Grier (born 1961), American guitarist
David Alan Grier (born 1956), American actor and comedian
David Gries (born 1939), American computer scientist
David J. Griffiths (born 1942), American physicist
David Grigoryan (born 1982), Armenian footballer
David Grigoryan (serviceman) (2000–2020), Armenian serviceman 
David Hieronymus Grindel (1776–1836), Latvian botanist 
David Grinspoon (born 1959), American astrobiologist
David Grisman (born 1945), American mandolinist
David Grissom, American guitarist
David Grizzle, American business executive
Dávid Gróf (born 1989), Hungarian footballer
David Groff (born 1950), American poet
David Groh (1939–2008), American actor
David Grosso (born 1970), American attorney and politician
David Groves (born 1942), Australian geologist
David Grubbs (born 1967), American musician
David Grubin (born 1944), American filmmaker
David Grusin (born 1934), American composer
David Grusky (born 1958), American sociologist
David Grutman (born 1974), American businessman
David Guas (born 1975), American chef
David Guetta (born 1967), French disc jockey
David Guggenheim, American screenwriter
David Antón Guijarro (born 1995), Spanish chess player
David W. Guion (1892–1981), American composer
David Gulasi, Australian social media figure
David Gulpilil (1953–2021), Australian traditional dancer
David Gurfein, American soldier
David P. Gushee (born 1962), American ethicist
David Guterson (born 1956), American novelist
David Guttenberg (born 1951), American politician
David Guttenfelder (born 1969), American photographer
David Guzmán (born 1990), Costa Rican footballer
David Gvantseladze (1937–1984), Georgian wrestler
David Gwillim (born 1948), English actor 
David Gwinnutt (born 1961), British photographer  
David Gwynn (1861–1910), Welsh rugby union footballer
David Gwynne-James (1937–2012), Welsh cricketer
David Gyasi (born 1980), British-Ghanaian actor
David Gyngell (born 1966), Australian businessman

H
David Haas (born 1957), American author
David Habib (born 1961), French politician
David Hackl (born 1963), Canadian director
David Hackworth (1930–2005), American journalist and soldier
David Hadley (born 1964), American businessman and politician
David Hafler (1919–2003), American audio engineer
David A. Hafler (born 1952), American neurologist
David Hagberg (1942–2019), American novelist
David Hagen (1973–2020), Scottish footballer
David Warner Hagen (1931–2022), American judge
David Hager (born 1946), American physician
David Hahn (1976–2016), American amateur nuclear scientist
David Haig (born 1955), English actor
David Haigh (born 1977), British lawyer
David Haines (aid worker) (1970–2014), British aid worker
David Hair (born 1965), New Zealand writer
David Hajdu (born 1955), American columnist
David Hajjar (born 1952), American scientist
David Hala (born 1989), Australian rugby league footballer
David Halberstam (1934–2007), American writer
David Haley (born 1958), American politician
David Haller (swimmer) (born 1945), British swimmer
David M. Halperin (born 1952), American theorist
David Halpern (canoeist) (born 1955), American sprint kayaker
David Halpern (psychologist) (born 1966), British civil servant and psychologist
David Hambrick, American professor
David A. Hamburg (1925–2019), American psychiatrist
David Hammons (born 1943), American artist
David Hampton (1964–2003), American con artist and robber
David Hann (born 1952), American politician
David Hannah (born 1973), Scottish footballer
David Hannah (footballer, born 1867) (1867–1???), Irish footballer
David Anumle Hansen (1923–2008), Ghanaian naval officer
David Harbour (born 1975), American actor
David Harney (1947–2019), English footballer
David Hartt (born 1967), Canadian artist
David Hasselhoff (born 1952), American actor, singer, songwriter
David Hatch (1939–2007), English radio producer
David Hatch (rugby league) (born 1959), Australian rugby union footballer
David Hatendi (1953–2012), Zimbabwean banker
David Hathaway (born 1932), British religious figure
David Haugh (born 1968), American columnist
David Hauser, American entrepreneur
David Hauss (born 1984), French triathlete
David Haussler (born 1953), American bioinformatician
David Havili (born 1994), New Zealand rugby union footballer
David Hawthorne (born 1985), American football player
David Haye (born 1980), British boxer
David Hayman (born 1948), Scottish film actor and director
David Hayter (born 1969), Canadian-American actor
David Hazeltine (born 1958), American pianist
David Hazony (born 1969), American-Israeli writer
David Headley (born 1960), American terrorist
David Heavener (born 1958), American singer-songwriter
David G. Hebert (born 1972), American musicologist
David Hedison (1927–2019), American actor
David Heimbach (1938–2017), American surgeon
David Hein, Canadian librettist
David W. Hein, American professor
David Heinz (born 1980), American film editor
David Held (1951–2019), British political scientist
David Helfgott (born 1947), Australian pianist
David Hellenius (born 1974), Swedish comedian
David B. Heller (born 1968), American businessman
David Helpling (born 1969), American guitarist
David Helwig (1938–2018), Canadian poet
David Hemblen (1941–2020), English-Canadian actor
David Hemmings (1941–2003), British actor
David Hendricks, American businessman
David Hendrix (born 1972), American football player
David Henrie (born 1989), American actor
David Henson (born 1984), British athlete
David Hepworth (born 1950), British journalist
David Herbert (1908–1995), British socialite and writer
David Herbert (artist) (born 1977), American sculptor
David Herro (born 1960), American businessman
David Herron (born 1984), American football player
David Hess (disambiguation), several people
David Hewlett (born 1968), English-Canadian actor
David Hewson (born 1953), British author
David Hey (1938–2016), English historian
David Heyman (born 1961), English producer
David Hibbett, American biology professor
David Hidalgo (born 1954), American singer-songwriter
David Higgs (born 1957), American organist
David Hilbert (1862–1943), German mathematician
David Hiller (born 1953), American lawyer
David Hilliard (born 1942), American activist
David Hilliard (photographer) (born 1964), American photographer
David Hillis (born 1958), American biologist
David Himmelstein, American physician
David Hinds (born 1956), British musician
David Hines (born 1945), English writer
David Gordon Hines (1915–2000), British colonial officer
David Hinkley (1944–2019), English statistician
David Hinton (born 1954), American poet
David Hirschfelder (born 1960), Australian musician
David Julian Hirsh (born 1973), Canadian actor
David Hirshey, American book editor
David Hite (1923–2004), American clarinetist
David Hitt (born 1975), American author
David Hixon (born 1952), American basketball coach
David Hobby (born 1965), American photographer
David Hoberman (born 1952), American producer
David Hockney (born 1937), English painter
David Hodgkiss (1948–2020), British administrator
David Hodne, American army general
David Hodo (born 1947), American singer
David Hoflin (born 1979), Swedish-Australian actor
David Hofman (1908–2003), American television presenter
David Hofmans (born 1943), American racehorse trainer
David George Hogarth (1862–1927), British archaeologist
David Hoggan (footballer) (born 1961), Scottish footballer
David L. Hoggan (1923–1988), American professor
David Hogness (1925–2019), American biochemist
David Holden (1924–1977), English journalist
David Holden (screenwriter), American television producer
David Holland (judge), Irish judge
David F. Holland (born 1973), American professor
David Hollander (born 1968), American television writer
David Hollister (born 1942), American politician
David Hollister (sport shooter) (born 1944), Australian sport shooter
David Holmberg (born 1991), American baseball player
David Holmgren (born 1955), Australian designer and educator
David Holoubek (born 1980), Czech football manager
David Holsinger (born 1945), American composer
David Holston (born 1986), American basketball player
David M. Holtzman, American neurologist
David Holy (born 1979), German designer
David T. Hon (born 1941), Hong Kong-American physicist
David Honey (born 1958), Australian politician
David Honeyford, Northern Irish politician
David Hood (born 1943), American bassist
David A. Hood, Canadian physiologist
David Horler (born 1943), English trombonist
David Ernest Hornell (1910–1944), Canadian recipient of the Victoria Cross
David Hornsby (born 1975), American actor
David Horovitch (born 1945), English Actor
David Hornik, American venture capitalist and philanthropist 
David Horsey (born 1951), American cartoonist
David Horsey (golfer) (born 1985), English golfer
David Horst (born 1985), American soccer player
David Hosack (1769–1835), American physician
David Hoselton (born 1968), Canadian screenwriter
David Hoskins, American television writer
David Hostetler (1926–2015), American sculptor
David Hostetter (1819–1888), American businessman
David Hou (born 1943), Taiwanese politician
David L. Hough (born 1937), American writer
David Housewright (born 1955), American author
David Hrčkulák (born 1992), Czech sports shooter
David Hsieh, Hong Kong-American professor
David Hsu, American entrepreneur
David Htan (born 1988), Burmese footballer
David Huang (born 1966), Taiwanese politician
David H. Hubel (1926–2013), Canadian-American neurophysiologist
David Hubert (born 1988), Belgian footballer
David Huddleston (1930–2016), American actor
David Huddleston (gymnast) (born 2000), Bulgarian gymnast
David Hudgins (born 1965), American television writer
David Huebner (born 1960), American diplomat
David Huerta (1949–2022), Mexican poet
David Huertas (born 1987), Puerto Rican basketball player
David Huffman (1945–1985), American actor
David Huizenga, American civil servant
David Hulse (born 1968), American baseball player
David Hume (1711–1776), Scottish philosopher
David Humm (1952–2018), American football player
David Humphrey (born 1955), American painter
David Humphries (1953–2020), English cricketer
David Huntley (1957–2017), Canadian lacrosse player and coach
David Huntsberger (born 1979), American comedian
David Huntsinger (born 1955), American pianist
David Hurd (born 1950), American composer
David Hurles (born 1944), American pornographer
David Hurley (born 1953), Australian army officer
David Huron (born 1954), Canadian professor
David Hurst (1926–2019), German actor
David Hurtado (born 1999), Ecuadorian racewalker
David Hussey (born 1977), Australian cricket coach
David Hussl (born 1992), Austrian sailor
David Hutcheson (1905–1976), British actor
David Hutcheson (footballer) (1892–1962), Scottish footballer
David Huynh (born 1983), Canadian actor
David Henry Hwang (born 1957), American playwright
David Hyland (born 1987), American football player
David Hyman (born 1967), American entrepreneur

I
David G. Iadevaia (born 1949), American author
David Ian (born 1961), British producer and actor
David Ibarra Muñoz (born 1930), Mexican economist
David Ibbetson, English legal scholar 
David Ibbotson, missing pilot
David Icke (born 1952), English conspiracy theorist
David Ickringill (1930–2012), English wrestler 
David Icove (born 1949), American criminal profiler
David Iftody (1956–2001), Romanian-Canadian politician 
David Ige (born 1957), American politician
David Igler, American historian
David Iglesias, American attorney
David Ignatius (born 1950), American journalist
David Ignatoff (1885–1954), Russian-American author
David Ignatow (1914–1997), American poet
David Ijaha (born 1990), English footballer 
David Ikanovich (born 1989), Russian footballer
David Ikard, American professor
David Ikin (born 1946), English footballer 
David Ilariani (born 1981), Georgian sprinter
Dávid Illés (born 1994), Hungarian footballer 
David Imlah, Australian curling coach 
David Immerglück (born 1961), American instrumentalist
David Imms (born 1945), English artist 
David Ince (1921–2017), Scottish fighter pilot 
David Indermaur, Australian criminologist
David Ing (born 1957), Canadian systems scientist
David Iñigo (born 1934), Argentine footballer
David Inshaw (born 1943), English artist 
David Into (1940–2015), American race car driver
David Iornos, Nicaraguan cyclist   
David Ipp (1938–2020), South African-Australian lawyer
David Ippolito (born 1945), American singer-songwriter
David Irons (born 1982), American football player
David Ironside (1925–2005), South African cricketer
David Isaacson, American army general
David Isay (born 1965), American radio producer
David Iserson (born 1977), American novelist
David M. Israel (born 1951), American television producer
David Israelite, American music executive
David Itkin (born 1957), American conductor and composer
David Ito (born 1966), Japanese comedian and businessman
Dávid Ivan (born 1995), Slovak footballer
David Iverson (born 1969), American Air Force officer
David Ives (born 1950), American playwright
David Izatt (1892–1916), Scottish footballer 
David Izazola (born 1991), Mexican footballer 
David Izenzon (1932–1979), American bassist
David Izonritei (born 1968), Nigerian boxer

J
David Jablonski (born 1953), American professor
David Jacka (born 1968), aviator and disability advocate
David Jacks (footballer) (born 1948), Australian rules footballer
David Jacks (businessman) (1822–1909), American businessman
David Jaco (born 1954), American boxer
David Jacoby (politician) (born 1956), American politician
David Stanley Jacubanis (1910–1985), Russian-American criminal and fugitive
David A. Jaeger, American professor
David Jaffe (born 1971), American video game designer
David Jagger (1891–1958), English painter
David Jahson (born 1954), Jamaican reggae singer
David Jameson (field hockey) (born 1984), Canadian field hockey player
David Jameson (governor) (1723–1793), American politician
David Jamison (skier), American para-alpine skier
David Jamison (politician) (1660–1739), Scottish-American lawyer
David Janer (born 1973), Spanish actor
David Jang (born 1949), Korean-American professor
David Janson (born 1950), English actor
David Janssen (1931–1980), American actor
David Jaomanoro (1953–2014), Malagasy writer
David Jarolím (born 1979), Czech footballer
David H. Jarvis (1862–1911), American captain in the United States Revenue Cutter Service
David Jason (born 1940), British actor
David Jasper (born 1951), English theologian
David Jassy (born 1974), Swedish musician
David Javerbaum (born 1971), American comedy writer
David Jaynes (born 1952), American football player
David Jefferies (1972–2003), English motorcycle racer
David Jeffrey (born 1962), Northern Irish football manager
David Lyle Jeffrey (born 1941), Canadian-American scholar
David Jelínek (born 1990), Czech basketball player
David Jemibewon (born 1940), Nigerian Army officer
David Jeremiah (born 1941), American political writer
David Jerison (born 1953), American mathematician
David Jessen (born 1996), Czech artistic gymnast
David C. Jewitt (born 1958), British-American astronomer
David Jisse (1946–2020), French musician and producer
David Johansen (born 1950), American singer-songwriter
David Gwilym John (1884–1958?), Welsh cartoonist 
David Joiner (born 1958), American game programmer
David Jude Jolicoeur (born 1968), American rapper
David Jolley (born 1948), American musician
David Jolly (born 1972), American attorney and lobbyist
David Jonas, American government official
David Jonkin (1???–1641), Scottish merchant
David Joris (1501–1556), Belgium Anabaptist leader
David Joselit, American art historian
David Jost (born 1972), German music producer
David W. Jourdan (born 1954), American author
David Jove (1942–2004), Canadian director
David Joyner (athletic director), American sports administrator
David Joyner (actor) (born 1963), American actor
David Julazadeh, American Air Force general
David Julius (born 1955), American physiologist
David Julyan (born 1967), English musician
David Jung, Filipino poker player
David Justice (born 1966), American baseball player

K
David Kahalekula Kaʻauwai (1833–1856), American lawyer and politician 
David Kabiller (born 1964), American businessman
David Kabua (born 1951), Marshallese politician
David Kaczynski (born 1949), American social figure
David Kadouch (born 1985), French pianist
David Kafulila (born 1982), Tanzanian politician
David Kajganich (born 1969), American screenwriter
David Kakabadze (1889–1952), Georgian painter
David Kamau (born 1965), Kenyan boxer
David Kämpf (born 1995), Czech ice hockey player
David Karnes (1948–2020), American politician and businessman
David Karp (born 1986), American entrepreneur
David Karr (1918–1979), American journalist
David Kaše (born 1997), Czech ice hockey player
David Kassan (born 1977), American painter
David Kato (c. 1964–2011), Ugandan teacher and LGBT rights activist
David Katzenstein (1952–2021), American virologist
David Kaufman, American actor
David Kaye, multiple people
David Kautter, American lawyer
David Kear (geologist) (1923–2019), New Zealand geologist
David T. Kearns (1930–2011), American businessman
David Keck, Canadian author
David Kedrowski (born 1942), American politician
David Keene (born 1945), American political consultant
David Kehr (born 1953), American film critic
David Keightley (1932–2017), American sinologist
David Keigel (known as Dave Kaye) (1906–1996), British pianist
David Keirsey (1921–2013), American psychologist
David H. Keller (1880–1966), American writer
David Kelsey (born 1932), American theologian
David Kendrick, American drummer
David Kendziera (born 1994), American runner
David Hume Kennerly (born 1947), American photographer
David Sabo Kente (born 1965), Nigerian politician
David Kenyon, British archaeologist
David Vreeland Kenyon (1930–2015), American judge
David Kerley (born 1957), American journalist
David Kersh (born 1970), American country singer
David Kershenbaum, American record producer
David Kestenbaum (born 1969), American radio producer
David Ketchum (born 1928), American actor
David Khakhaleishvili (1971–2021), Georgian mixed martial artist
David Khan (politician) (born 1974), Canadian politician
David Khan (diplomat) (1795–1851), English diplomat 
David Kherdian (born 1931), Armenian-American poet
David Kidwell (born 1977), New Zealand rugby union coach
David Kiefer (born 1984), American basketball coach
David Kiki (born 1993), Beninese footballer
David Kikoski (born 1961), American jazz pianist
David Kilcullen (born 1967), Australian author
David Kilgour (1941–2022), Canadian author
David R. Kingsley (1918–1944), American Air Force officer
David Leleo Kinimaka (1851–1884), Hawaiian noble
David Kinkade (born 1983), American musician
David Kipiani (1951–2001), Georgian footballer
David Kirch (born 1936), British businessman
David Kircus (born 1980), American football player
David Kirk (disambiguation), several people
David Kirkland (1878–1964), American actor and director
David Kirschner (born 1955), American producer
David Kitay (born 1961), American film composer
David Kitchen (born 1953), South African sailor
David Kitt (born 1975), Irish musician
David Kitur (born 1962), Kenyan runner
David Kladney, American attorney
David Klamen (born 1961), American artist
David Klammert (born 1994), Czech judoka
David Klass (born 1960), American screenwriter and novelist 
David Klavins (born 1954), German-Latvian piano maker
David Klawans (born 1968), American film producer
David Kldiashvili (1862–1931), Georgian writer
David Klech (born 1988), American decathlete
David Klemmer (born 1993), Australian rugby league footballer
David Klenerman (born 1959), British chemist
David Klingler (born 1969), American football player
David Knezek (born 1986), American politician
David Knoller (born 1963), American producer
David Knopfler (born 1952), English musician and guitarist
David Koch (1940–2019), American businessman and philanthropist
David Kočí (born 1981), Czech ice hockey player
David Kocieniewski (born 1963), American journalist
David Koechner (born 1962), American actor
David Koepp (born 1963), American screenwriter
David Koff (1939–2014), American filmmaker
David Kohan (born 1964), American television producer
David Kohler (born 1966), American businessman
David Koker (1921–1945), Dutch philosopher and Holocaust victim
David A. Kolb (born 1939), American educational theorist
David Kollar (born 1983), Slovak guitarist
David Koloane (1938–2019), South African artist
David Kolomatis (born 1989), American ice hockey player
David Koma, Georgian fashion designer
David Komansky (1939–2021), American businessman
David Komatz (born 1991), Austrian biathlete
David Konečný (born 1982), Czech volleyball player
David Kong, Hong Kong businessman
David Konstan (born 1940), American classicist
David Kopay (born 1942), American football player
David Kopp (born 1979), German cyclist
Dávid Korányi (born 1980), Hungarian foreign minister
David Koresh (1959–1993), American cult leader
David Korins (born 1976), American designer
David Korten (born 1937), American author and professor
David Kracov (born 1968), American painter
David C. Kraemer (born 1955), Israeli theologian
David Anthony Kraft (1952–2021), American comic book writer
David Kraiselburd (1912–1974), Argentine journalist
David Krakauer (musician) (born 1956), American musician
David Krane, American investor
David Krathwohl (1921–2016), American psychologist
David Krause (born 1970), Australian rugby league footballer
David Krech (1909–1977), Polish-American psychologist
David Lloyd Kreeger (1909–1990), American philanthropist
David Kreizman (born 1974), American writer
David Krejčí (born 1986), Czech ice hockey player
David Krentz, American artist 
David M. Kreps (born 1950), American game theorist
David Kretzmer (born 1943), Israeli lawyer
David Kreuger (born 1967), Swedish songwriter
David S. Kris (born 1966), American lawyer
David Kristian (born 1967), Canadian musician
David Kross (born 1990), German actor
David Kroyanker (born 1939), Israeli architectural historian
David Krumholtz (born 1978), American actor
David Kudler (born 1962), American editor
David Kudrave (born 1966), American racing driver
David E. Kuhl (1929–2017), American scientist
David Paul Kuhn, American author
David Kuijers (born 1962), South African painter
David Kuijken, Dutch pianist
David J. Kukulka, American professor
David Kurten (born 1971), British politician
David Kushner (born 1968), American writer
David Kushnir (1931–2020), Israeli long-jumper
David Kustoff (born 1966), American politician
David Vahtangovich Kutaliya (born 1966), Russian lawyer 
David Kvachadze (born 1951), Georgian light-heavyweight boxer 
David Kvasnička (born 1999), Czech ice hockey player
David Květoň (born 1988), Czech hockey player 
David P. Kvile (1861–1918), Norwegian teacher, farmer and politician 
David Kwong (born 1980), American magician
David Kyle (1919–2016), American writer
David Kyles (born 1989), American basketball player
David Kynaston (born 1951), English historian
David E. Kyvig (1943/1944–2015), American historian

L
David Labaree, American historian
David Labiosa (born 1961), American actor
David Labrava (born 1962), American actor
David LaBruyere (born 1969), American musician
David LaChapelle (born 1963), American photographer
David Lacy, Scottish minister
David Lacy-Scott (1920–2020), English cricketer
David Ladd (born 1947), American actor
David LaFlamme (born 1941), American singer
David LaFleur (born 1974), American football player
David Lafuente (born 1982), Spanish comic book artist
David Lagercrantz (born 1962), Swedish journalist
David Lago (born 1979), Cuban-American actor
David LaGrand (born 1966), American politician
David La Haye (born 1966), Canadian actor
David Laliberté (born 1986), Canadian ice hockey player
David Lama (1990–2019), Austrian sports climber
David Lambie (1925–2019), Scottish politician
David Lammy (born 1972), British politician
David Lamont (born 1953), Australian politician
David Lamont (moderator) (1753–1837), Scottish minister
David Lamptey (died 2012), Ghanaian Politician 
David Lange (1942–2005), New Zealand politician
David Langton (1912–1994), British actor
David Land (1918–1995), British theatre producer
David Lander (1947–2020), American actor and baseball scout
David Landsberg (1944–2018), American actor
David Lanz (born 1950), American pianist
David Lapham (born 1970), American comic book writer
David G. Larimer (born 1944), American judge
David Laro (1942–2018), American judge
David Larsen (born 1980), American actor
David Larter (born 1940), Scottish cricketer
David Lascelles (born 1950), English politician and producer
David Lascher (born 1972), American actor
David Lassner (born 1954), American computer scientist
David Lau (born 1966), Israeli rabbi
David Lauren (born 1971), American businessman
David Lawrence Jr. (born 1942), American nationally known newspaper editor and publisher 
David Laws (born 1965), British politician
David Layzer (1925–2019), American astrophysicist
David Lazar (author) (born 1957), American writer
David Lazarus, American columnist
David Lazer, American professor
David Leake (born 1935), Argentine missionary
David Lean (1908–1991), English director
David Leavitt (born 1961), American novelist
David Le Batard (born 1972), Cuban-American graphic and fine artist 
David Lebe (born 1948), American photographer
David Lebón (born 1952), Argentine musician
David Leckie (1951–2021), Australian media manager
David Ledecký (born 1993), Czech footballer
David Leebron (born 1955), American attorney
David Adams Leeming (born 1937), American philologist
David Lefèvre (cyclist) (born 1972), French cyclist
David Lefèvre (serial killer) (born 1980), French serial killer
David Legates, American climatologist
David Leggio (born 1984), American ice hockey player
David Legwand (born 1980), American ice hockey player
David Lehman (born 1948), American poet
David Leisure (born 1950), American actor
David Leitch (born 1975), American filmmaker
David Leite (born 1960), Portuguese-American memoirist
David Le Marquand (born 1950), English lawn bowler
David LeNeveu (born 1983), Canadian ice hockey player
David Lenz (born 1962), American painter
David Ari Leon (born 1967), American musician
David Leonhardt (born 1973), American journalist
David Lepper (born 1945), British politician
David J. Lesar (born 1953), American businessman
David Lesperance, American army officer
David Ovide L'Espérance (1864–1941), Canadian manufacturer and politician 
David Letourneau (born 1989), Canadian squash player
David Letterman (born 1947), American comedian
David N. Levinson (1935–2019), American businessman and politician
David Levinthal (born 1949), American photographer
David Levithan (born 1972), American author
David Glenn Lewis, victim of a hit and run
David Lewiston (1929–2017), English music collector
David J. Ley (born 1973), American clinical psychologist
David Leyonhjelm (born 1952), Australian politician
David Licauco (born 1995), Filipino actor
David Licht, American drummer
David Lichtenstein (born 1960), American businessman
David Liddell-Grainger (1930–2007), English politician
David Liddle, American computer developer
David Liederman (born 1949), American chef and businessman
David Lienemann, American photographer
David Lifton (1939–2022), American author
David Ligare (born 1945), American painter
David Lightfoot (1959/1960–2021), Australian producer
David Lightfoot (linguist) (born 1945), American linguist
David Lighty (born 1988), American basketball player
David E. Lilienthal (1899–1981), American attorney and public administrator
David Liljemark (born 1973), Swedish comic artist
David Lillard (born 1953), American lawyer and politician
David Lillehaug (born 1954), American judge
David Lilly (born 1986), Scottish footballer
David Lin (born 1950), Taiwanese politician  
David Linarès (born 1975), French footballer
David Linden (born 1961), American neuroscience professor
David Linden (politician) (born 1990), Scottish politician
David J. Lipman, American biologist
David Lindsay-Abaire (born 1969), American playwright
David L. Lindsey (born 1944), American novelist
David Lindsey (politician) (born 1931), American politician
David Lipper (born 1974), Canadian actor
David Lipscomb (1831–1917), American minister
David Lipsky (born 1965), American author
David Lipsky (golfer) (born 1988), American golfer
David Lisak, American clinical psychologist
David Liss (born 1966), American writer
David Liti (born 1996), New Zealand weightlifter
David Litvinov (born 1993), Israeli weightlifter
David R. Liu (born 1973), American chemist and biologist
David Livermore (born 1980), English footballer
David Livermore (microbiologist), British microbiologist
David Livramento (born 1983), Portuguese cyclist
David Loades (1934–2016), British historian
David Lobell, American agricultural ecologist
David Lochary (1944–1977), American actor
David Lock (born 1960), British politician
David Lockhart (??–1845), English botanist
David Loera (born 1998), Spanish-American soccer player
David Lofton (born 1984), American football player
David Loggie (born 1957), English footballer
David Lohr (born 1975), American journalist
David Loiseau (born 1979), Canadian mixed martial artist
David Loko, Papa New Guinean rugby player
David Lomax (born 1970), New Zealand rugby coach
David Lomax (journalist) (1938–2014), British reporter
David Longdon (born 1965), British musician
David Longe-King (born 1995), English footballer
David Longhurst (1965–1990), English footballer
David Longmuir, Scottish football executive
David Longoria (born 1977), American singer-songwriter
David Longstaff (born 1974), British ice hockey player
David Longstreth (born 1981), American singer-songwriter
David B. Loomis (1817–1897), American politician
David S. Louderback (1851–1911), American politician
David Lough (born 1986), American baseball player
David Loughery, American screenwriter
David Loveday (1896–1985), English bishop 
David K. Lovegren, American film producer 
David Lovelock (born 1938), English physicist and mathematician
David Lovering (born 1961), American musician and magician 
David Loverne (born 1976), American soccer player
David Lowenthal (1923–2018), American historian
David Lowy (born 1954), Australian aviator and musician
David Loxton (1943–1989), British producer
David Loy (born 1947), American scholar
David Elliot Loye (1925–2022), American author
David Lozano (born 1988), Spanish cyclist
David Lozano (playwright), American director and playwright
David Lozeau (born 1975), American artist
David Lubar (born 1954), American author and video game programmer
David Lubin (1849–1919), Polish merchant
David Lubinski, American professor
David Lucchino (born 1969), American entrepreneur
David Lunceford (1934–2009), offensive lineman 
David M. Ludlum (1910–1997), American historian
David Luechtefeld (born 1940), American politician 
David Luenberger (born 1937), American mathematical scientist
David Luff (born 1969), Australian journalist
David Luff (legal academic), Belgian professor
David Y.H. Lui (1944–2011), Canadian impresario
David Luiz (born 1987), Brazilian footballer
David Lujan (born 1965), American politician
David Luke (1921–2005), British translator
David Lumsdaine (born 1931), Australian composer
David Luneau (born 1965), American politician
David Luque-Velasco (born 1984), Spanish tennis player
David Lurie (born 1951), South African photographer
David Lurie (equestrian) (born 1939), American equestrian
David Luscombe (1938–2021), British professor
David Lust (1968–2021), American politician
David Lutalo (born 1986), Ugandan musician
David Lvovich (1882–1950), Russian-Jewish politician

M
David Maas (1963–2020), American magician, circus performer and entertainer
David Mabuza (born 1960), South African politician
David Macaulay (born 1946), British-American illustrator
David MacBeth (born 1935), English singer
David MacDougall (born 1939), American-Australian anthropologist
David Macey (1949–2011), English translator
David Macklin (born 1978), American football player
David Machado (born 1978), Portuguese writer
David Maclean (born 1953), British politician
David MacLennan (1937–2020), Canadian biochemist
David MacMillan (born 1968), Scottish chemist
David MacRitchie (1851–1925), Scottish folklorist
David Sydney Maddicott (born 1953), British diplomat
David Maddison (1947–2019), British judge
David M. Maddox (born 1938), American general
David Madel (born 1938), British politician
David Madigan (born 1962), Irish-American statistician
David Magarshack (1899–1977), British translator
David Magee (born 1962), American screenwriter
David Magerman (born 1968), American computer scientist
David Magleby (born 1949), American professor
David Magley (born 1959), American basketball player and coach
David Maier (born 1953), American professor
David Maine (born 1963), American novelist
David F. Mains (1874–1949), American politician
David Mainse (1936–2017), Canadian televangelist
David Zane Mairowitz (born 1943), American writer
David Maisel, American film producer
David Maisel (visual artist) (born 1961), American photographer
David Maister (born 1947), American professor
David Makhura (born 1968), South African politician
David Makovsky (born 1960), American professor
David Malachowski (1955–2022), American guitarist
David J. Malan, American computer scientist
David Malebranche (born 1969), Haitian-American doctor
David Maley (born 1963), American radio analyst
David Malin (born 1941), British-Australian astronomer
David Malinowski, American make-up artist
David Mallett (born 1951), American singer-songwriter
David Malouf (born 1934), Australian writer
David Malpass (born 1956), American economic analyst
David Malukas (born 2001), Lithuanian-American race car driver
David Malyan (1904–1976), Armenian actor
David Mamet (born 1947), American playwright
David Mancuso (1944–2016), American disc jockey
David Mandel (born 1970), American executive producer
David S. Manners (1808–1884), American politician
David Manoyan (born 1990), Armenian footballer
David Zen Mansley, American voice actor
David Mantell (1934–2017), English cricketer
David Manzur (born 1929), Colombian painter
David S. Mao, American law librarian
David Maraniss (born 1949), American journalist
David R. Marchant, American geologist
David Marciano (born 1960), American actor
David Marconi, American screenwriter
David Maree (born 1989), South African cyclist
David Margesson (1890–1965), British politician
David Margulies (1937–2016), American actor
David Maroul (born 1983), American baseball player
David R. Marples (born 1952), Canadian historian
David Marquet, American naval captain
David Marrero (born 1980), Spanish tennis player
David Daniel Marriott (born 1939), American politician
David Martosko (born 1970), American political editor
David Marus (born 1986), Ugandan long-distance runner
David Marwell (born 1951), American historian
David Maslanka (1943–2017), American composer
David Masondo (born 1974), South African politician
David Massamba (born 1992), Gabonese footballer
David Masters (born 1978), English cricketer
David Masterson (born 1998), South African cricketer
David Matas (born 1943), Canadian legal counsel
David Mathias (born 1991), Indian cricketer
David Mathis (born 1974), American golfer
David Mathison (born 1960), American author and speaker
David Matranga (born 1975), American voice actor
David Matsumoto (born 1959), American psychologist
David Mattingley (1922–2017), Australian pilot
David Burroughs Mattingly (born 1956), American digital artist
David Matula (born 1937), American mathematician
 David Matuszak, American writer
David Matza (1930–2018), American sociologist
David Maupin, American gallery director
David Edward Maust (1954–2006), American serial killer
David Mawutor (born 1992), Ghanaian-Tajikistani footballer
David R. Mayhew (born 1937), American political scientist
David Maynier (born 1968), South African politician
David Mayo (born 1993), American football player
David Mays, American magazine writer
David Mazouz (born 2001), American actor
David Mazzucchelli (born 1960), American comic artist
David Mba, American academic administrator
David McAfee (1947–2005), American politician
David McAlister (1951–2015), English actor
David A. McAllester (born 1956), American computer scientist
David McBride (born 1942), American politician
David McBride (whistleblower) (born 1963/1964), Australian whistleblower
David McCagg (born 1958), American swimmer
David McCall (1940–2021), Australian bishop
David McCall (businessman) (born 1934), Scottish businessman
David McCallum (born 1933), Scottish actor
David McCampbell (1910–1996), American naval captain
David McCandless (born 1971), British data journalist
David McCann (cyclist) (born 1973), Irish cyclist
David McCarty (born 1969), American baseball player
David McClelland (1917–1998), American psychologist
David J. McClements, English food scientist
David McComb (1962–1999), Australian musician
David McCord (1897–1997), American poet
David McCormack (born 1968), Australian singer-songwriter
David McCormack (basketball) (born 1999), American basketball player
David McCormick (born 1965), American business executive
David McCracken (born 1981), Scottish footballer
David McCrae (1900–1976), Scottish footballer
David McCray (born 1986), German basketball player
David McCreery (born 1957), Northern Irish footballer
David McCullagh (born 1967), Irish journalist
David McCullough (1933–2022), American author
David McDermott (born 1988), English footballer
David McDiarmid (1952–1995), Australian artist and political activist
David McDonough, American politician
David McDowell (1963–2014), American psychiatrist
David McDuling (born 1989), Australian rugby union footballer
David McDuff (born 1945), British translator
David McFadzean (born 1949), American producer
David McFarland, American animal behavior scientist
David McFarland (politician) (1822–1902), American politician
David McGee (born 1947), New Zealand commissioner
David McGoldrick (born 1987), British-Irish footballer
David McGreavy (born 1951), English convicted murderer
David McHugh (born 1955), Irish rugby union referee
David McIlwraith (born 1967), Canadian actor
David McIlveen (born 1981), Northern Irish politician
David Lee McInnis (born 1973), American actor
David A. McIntee (born 1968), British writer 
David McIntyre (born 1987), Canadian ice hockey player
David McKeague (born 1946), American judge
David McKee (1935–2022), British writer
David McKie (born 1935), British journalist
David McKienzie (born 1979), American volleyball player
David D. McKiernan (born 1950), American general
David McKinley (born 1947), American businessman and politician
David McKitterick (born 1948), English librarian and academic
David McKittrick (born 1949), Northern Irish journalist
David McKnight (1935–2006), Canadian-British anthropologist
David McLane, American businessman
David McLeod (born 1971), American football player
David McMahon (born 1951), Australian rules footballer
David McMahon (association footballer) (born 1981), Irish footballer
David McNee (1925–2019), Scottish police officer
David McPhail (1945–2021), New Zealand actor
David McPhail (rugby league) (1886–??), New Zealand rugby league footballer
David McRae, American politician
David McReynolds (1929–2018), American politician
David McRobbie (born 1934), Australian writer
David McSavage (born 1966), Irish comedy writer
David McTaggart (1932–2001), Canadian environmentalist
David McVicar (born 1966), Scottish opera director
David McWane (born 1976), American musician
David Meade (born 1976), American politician
David Meade (author), American conspiracy author
David Medalla (1942–2020), Filipino artist
David Meece (born 1952), American musician
David Megginson (born 1964), Canadian software consultant
David Mehan, Australian politician
David Mehić (born 1997), Serbian volleyball player
David Meirhofer (1949–1974), American serial killer
David Meister (born 1962), American fashion designer
David Melding (born 1962), Welsh politician
David Meller (born 1959), British businessman
David Mendell, American journalist
David Mendenhall (born 1971), American actor
David Menkin (born 1977), Norwegian-American actor
David Méresse (1931–2020), French footballer
David Merhar, American ice hockey player
David Merrick (1911–2000), American theatrical producer
David Messerschmitt (born 1945), American engineer
David Messina (born 1974), Italian comics artist
David Metzger (born 1960), American composer
David Meunier (born 1973), American actor
David Meyler (born 1989), Irish footballer
David Micevski (born 1986), Australian footballer
David Michelinie (born 1948), American comic book writer
David Michôd (born 1972), Australian film director
David Milgaard (1952–2022), Canadian criminal
David Miliband (born 1965), British politician
David Miller, multiple people
David Scott Milton (1934–2020), American author
David Minasian, American film producer
David Minier (born 1934), American politician
David Mirkin (born 1955), American director
David Mirvish (born 1944), Canadian art dealer
David Miscavige (born 1960), American leader of the Scientology organisation
David Mixner (born 1946), American political activist
David Mizejewski, American naturalist
David Mlinaric (born 1939), British interior decorator
David Modell (1960–2017), American sports executive
David Moffat (1839–1911), American financier
David M. Moffett (born 1952), American businessman
David Mogotlane (born 1992), South African cricketer
David Moos (born 1965), American art curator
David Moosman (born 1986), American football player
David Monaghan (1922–1944), New Zealand cricketer and soldier
David Monahan (born 1971), American actor
David Monasterio (born 1971), Puerto Rican swimmer
David Monette, American craftsman
David Moniac (1802–1836), American military officer
David Howard Maude-Roxby-Montalto di Fragnito (born 1934), British craftsman
David Moo (born 1970), American former voice actor
David Mordaunt (1937–2020), English cricketer
David Morrissey (born 1964), English actor
David Mortensen, American judge
David Moscow (born 1974), American actor
David Moses (1925–1999), Welsh rugby union footballer
David Lokonga Moses, South Sudanese politician
David Mota (born 1985), Spanish rugby union footballer
David Mota (footballer) (1942–2015), Venezuelan footballer
David Moufang (born 1966), German musician
David C. Mowery (born 1952), American professor
David Moylan (1874–1942), American member of the Cleveland City Council
David Moyes (born 1963), Scottish football manager
David Moyo (born 1994), Zimbabwean footballer
David Mudd (1933–2020), British politician
David Muench (born 1936), American photographer
David Muffato (born 1971), Brazilian racing driver
David G. Mugar, Armenian-American businessman
David Muhammad (born 1970), Trinidadian author
David Muhoozi (born 1965), Ugandan military officer
David Muir (born 1973), American journalist and news anchor
David Muise (1949–2017), Canadian politician
David Mullin, English archaeologist
David Mumford (born 1937), American mathematician
David Mundell (born 1962), Scottish politician
David Mundy (born 1985), Australian rules footballer
David Mungai (born 1968), Kenyan runner
David Mungoshi (1949–2020), Zimbabwean novelist
David Ibarra Muñoz (born 1929), Mexican economist 
David Muntaner (born 1983), Spanish track cyclist
David Mura (born 1952), American author
David H. Murdock (born 1923), American businessman
David Murillo (born 1993), Colombian footballer
David Musgrave (born 1965), Australian poet
David Musila (born 1943), Kenyan politician
David Musuguri (born 1920), Tanzanian soldier
David Musulbes (born 1972), Russian wrestler
David Mutendera (born 1979), Zimbabwean cricketer
David Mwiraria (1938–2017), Kenyan minister
David Myatt (born 1950), British poet and philosopher

N
David Nabarro (born 1949), British civil servant
David Nadien (1926–2014), American violinist
David R. Nagle (born 1943), American politician and lawyer
Dávid Nagy (born 1981), Hungarian musician
David Nahmad (born 1947), Monegasque art dealer
David Nahmias (born 1964), American judge
David S. Nahom (born 1966), American lieutenant general
David Nail (born 1979), American country singer
David Nainkin (born 1970), South African tennis player
David Najem (born 1992), American soccer player
David Nakamura (born 1970), American journalist
David Nakayama (born 1978), American artist
David Nakdimen (1933–2020), American journalist
David Nakhid (born 1964), Trinidadian footballer
David Nalbandian (born 1982), Argentine tennis player
David Nance, American guitarist
David Nangle, American politician
David Narcizo (born 1966), American musician
David Narey (born 1956), Scottish footballer
David Nasaw (born 1945), American author
David Nascimento (born 1966), Cape Verdean-Portuguese football coach
David Nason (born 1970), American lawyer and financier
David Naughton (born 1951), American actor
David Naylor (born 1954), Canadian physicist
David J. Naylor (1843–1926), American naval officer
David Nazarian (born 1961), Iranian-American businessman
David Nazim (born 1996), Nigerian footballer
David Ndii, Kenyan economist
David Nedohin (born 1973), Canadian curler
David Needham (born 1949), English footballer
David Neeleman (born 1959), Brazilian-American entrepreneur
David Neft (born 1937), American writer and historian
David Neilson (born 1949), English actor
David Neitz (born 1975), Australian rules footballer
David Neiwert (born 1956), American journalist
David Nekrutman (born 1973), American-Israeli Jewish theologian
David Nelms (born 1961), American businessman
David Nemirovsky (born 1976), Canadian hockey player
David Nepomuceno (1900–1939), Filipino runner
David Neres (born 1997), Brazilian footballer
David Nesbitt (born 1991), Bahamian basketball player
David Neuhaus (born 1962), Israeli-German religious scholar
David Neumann (born 1965), American choreographer
David Neumark (born 1959), American economist
David Nevue (born 1965), American solo pianist
David Newhan (born 1973), American baseball player
David Newsom (born 1962), American actor
David D. Newsom (1918–2008), American diplomat
David Newsome (1942–2011), American scientist
David N'Gog (born 1989), French footballer
David Ngoombujarra (1967–2011), Indigenous Australian actor
David Nibert (born 1953), American sociologist
David Niblock (born 1981), Irish Gaelic footballer
David Nichtern (born 1948), American songwriter
David Nickson (born 1929), British businessman
David Nicolle (born 1944), British historian
David Nied (born 1968), American baseball player
David Nieto (1654–1728), Italian explainer
David Niles (1888–1952), American political advisor
David Nimmer (born 1955), American lawyer and professor
David Niose (born 1962), American attorney and activist
David Nirenberg (born 1964), American historian
David Nish (born 1947), English footballer
David Nitschmann der Bischof (1698–1772), Czech missionary
David Niven (1910–1983), English actor
David Niven Jr. (born 1942), British film producer
David Njoku (born 1996), American football player
David ole Nkedianye (born 1963), Kenyan politician
David Noel (born 1984), American basketball player
David Nofoaluma (born 1993), Australian rugby league footballer
David Nohe (born 1952), American politician
David Noon (born 1946), American composer
David Norbrook (born 1950), English professor
David Nordahl (born 1941), American painter
David Norona (born 1972), Cuban-American actor
David Norquist (born 1966), American financial manager
David Norrie (born 1963), American football player
David Nosek (born 1981), Czech ice hockey player
David Noton (born 1957), British photographer
David Nott (born 1956), Welsh surgeon
David Novarro (born 1959), American television journalist
David Nualart (born 1951), Spanish mathematician
David Nucifora (born 1962), Australian rugby league footballer
David Nuffer (born 1952), American judge
David Nugent (born 1985), English footballer
David Nugent (American football) (born 1977), American football player
David Nunan (born 1949), Australian linguist
David Nurse (born 1976), English footballer
David Nutt (born 1951), English neuropsychopharmacologist 
David Nuttall (born 1962), British politician
David Nutter (born 1960), American television director
David Nuuhiwa (born 1948), American surfer
David Nuyoma (born 1963), Namibian stock market Chairman
David Nwaba (born 1993), American basketball player
David Nyathi (born 1969), South African footballer
David Nyika (born 1995), New Zealand boxer
David Nykl (born 1967), Czech-Canadian actor

O
David Oakes (born 1983), English actor
David S. Oderberg (born 1963), Australian philosopher
David Ochieng (born 1992), Kenyan footballer
Davíð Oddsson (born 1948), Icelandic politician
David O'Doherty (born 1975), Irish comedian
David Odonkor (born 1984), German footballer
David Oei (born 1950), Hong Kong-American pianist
David Oelhoffen (born 1968), French film director
David W. Ogden (born 1953), American lawyer
David Oh (born 1960), American attorney
David O'Halloran (1955–2013), Australian rules footballer
David O'Halloran (cricketer) (born 2000), Irish cricketer
David O'Hara (born 1965), Scottish actor
David O'Hare (born 1990), Irish tennis player
David Oistrakh (1908–1974), Soviet violinist
David Okereke (born 1997), Nigerian footballer
David Ezra Okonşar (born 1961), Turkish-Belgian pianist
David Oks (born 2001), American political activist
David Okumu (born 1982), Kenyan cricketer
David O'Leary (born 1958), Irish football manager
David O'List (born 1950), English guitarist
David O'Loughlin (born 1978), Irish cyclist
David O'Loughlin (politician), Australian politician
David Olney (1948–2020), American singer-songwriter
David Olusoga (born 1970), British historian
David Omand (born 1947), British civil servant
David O'Morchoe (1928–2019), British army officer
David F. O'Neill (1904–1963), American naval officer
David Ono, Japanese-American news anchor
David Onyemata (born 1992), Nigerian-Canadian football player
David Opas (1936–1980), Australian judge
David Opatoshu (1918–1996), American actor
David Opoku (born 1992), Ghanaian footballer
David Oppenheimer (1834–1897), Canadian entrepreneur
David Orbansky (1843–1897), American Union Army soldier  
David Oreck (1923–2023), American entrepreneur
David Orentlicher, American educator and politician
David Ormsby-Gore (1918–1985), British diplomat and politician  
David Ortiz (born 1975), Dominican baseball player
David Oscarson (born 1966), American sculptor
David Oshinsky (born 1944), American historian
David Osit (born 1987), American filmmaker
David Ospina (born 1988), Colombian footballer
David Ossman (born 1936), American writer
David Ostrosky (born 1956), Mexican actor
David Ostrowski (born 1981), German painter
David Oteo (born 1973), Mexican footballer
David Otero (born 1980), Spanish singer
David Ott (born 1947), American musical composer
David N. Ott (1937–2020), American politician and lawyer
David Ottignon, American Marine Corps major general
David Otto (born 1999), German footballer
David Otunga (born 1980), American actor and wrestler
David Oubel (born 1975), Spanish convicted criminal
David Ousted (born 1985), Danish footballer
David Outcalt (1935–2013), American academic administrator
David Hicks Overmyer (1889–1973), American artist 
David Overstreet (1958–1984), American football player
David Owens (born 1962), Australian politician
David Owe (born 1977), Danish actor and stuntman 
David Owino (born 1988), Kenyan footballer
David Owino (footballer, born 1998) (born 1998), Kenyan footballer
David Owusu (born 1998), English footballer
David Oxley (1920–1985), English actor
David Oxton (born 1945), New Zealand racing driver
David Oyedepo (born 1954), Nigerian preacher
David Oyelowo (born 1976), English actor
David Oyite-Ojok (1940–1983), Ugandan military commander
David Ozio (born 1954), American bowler
David Ozmanov (born 1995). Russian footballer 
David Ozonoff, American public health and medicine professor

P
David Paas (born 1971), Belgian footballer 
David Pablos (born 1983), Mexican director
David Pack (born 1952), American musician
David Packard (1912–1996), American electrical engineer and entrepreneur
David Woodley Packard (born 1940), American professor
David Packouz (born 1982), American arms dealer and inventor
David Padgett (born 1985), American basketball coach
David Paetkau (born 1972), Canadian actor
David Paetz (born 1940), New Zealand cricketer 
David Paich (born 1954), American musician
David Paintin (1930–2019), British doctor
David Paisley (born 1979), Scottish actor
David Pakman (born 1984), Argentine-American political commentator
David Raju Palaparthi (born 1958), Indian legislator
David Palecek (1972–2010), American consultant
David Palffy (born 1969), Canadian actor
David Palladini (1946–2019), American illustrator
David Pallister (1945–2021), British journalist
David Palumbo (born 1982), American illustrator
David Paniagua (born 1959), Bolivian footballer
David Panka (born 1999), Dutch footballer
David W. Panuelo (born 1964), Micronesian politician
David Papillon (1691–1792), British lawyer and politician
David Papillon (architect) (1581–1659), French architect
David Papineau, British philosopher
David Paradelo (born 1985), Canadian water polo coach
David Parmley (born 1959), American vocalist
David Parry-Evans (1935–2020), British air force commander
David Parry-Jones (1933–2017), Welsh sports commentator
David Pasquesi (born 1960), American actor
David Passig (born 1957), Israeli futurist
David Pastorius, American bass guitarist
David Pastrňák (born 1996), Czech ice hockey player
David Pate (born 1962), American tennis player
David Patiño (born 1967), Mexican footballer
David Paton (born 1949), Scottish bassist
David Pauley (born 1983), American baseball player
David Paulides, American police officer and investigator
David Paulino (born 1994), Dominican baseball player
David Pawson (1930–2020), British evangelical minister
David Paymer (born 1954), American actor
David Peace (born 1967), English writer
David Pears (1921–2009), British philosopher
David Peaston (1957–2012), American singer
David Pecker (born 1951), American publisher
David Peckinpah (1951–2006), American television writer
David Pelletier (born 1974), Canadian figure skater
David Pellow (born 1969), American professor
David Pender (born 1987), American football player
David Penner (1958–2020), Canadian architect
David Pentreath (1933–2019), English naval officer
David Penzer, American realtor
David Peralta (born 1987), Venezuelan baseball player
David Perdiguero (born 1984), Spanish football manager
David Perdue (born 1949), American businessman and politician
David Perlman (1918–2020), American journalist
David Perlmutter (born 1954), American doctor and author
David Perno (born 1967), American baseball coach
David Perpetuini (born 1979), English footballer
David Perron (born 1988), Canadian ice hockey player
David Petel (1921–2019), Israeli politician
Dave Peterson (ice hockey) (1931–1997), American ice hockey coach
David Petraeus (born 1952), American military officer and CIA director
David Petrović (born 2003), Serbian footballer
David Pettifor (1945–2017), British metallurgist
David Pevsner (born 1958), American actor
David Peyman, American attorney
David Pfaff (born 1966), South African businessman and former cricketer
David Pfeffer (born 1982), German singer 
David Pfeil (born 1967), American former soccer midfielder  
David Pham (born 1967), Vietnamese-American poker player
David Philip (1880–1917), Scottish footballer
David Butt Philip (born 1980), British tenor
David Philipps (born 1977), American journalist and author 
David Philipson (1862–1949), American rabbi
David Phiri (1937–2012), Zambian businessman
David Phoenix (born 1966), English biochemist 
David Pichler (born 1968), American diver
David V. Picker (1931–2019), American film executive
David Pietrusza (born 1949), American author and historian
David Pike (born 1962), English cricketer
David Maryanayagam Swamidoss Pillat (1905–1969), Indian clergyman
David Pines (1924–2018), American professor
David Pingree (1933–2005), American historian
David Pion-Berlin, American political scientist
David Pipe (born 1983), Welsh footballer
David Pipe (racehorse trainer), English racehorse trainer
David Pirie (born 1953), English screenwriter
David W. Piston, American physicist
David Pithey (1936–2018), Zimbabwean cricketer
David R. Pitts, American healthcare executive
David Pittu (born 1967), American actor
David Pizarro (born 1979), Chilean footballer
David Plaisted, American computer science professor
David Plante (born 1940), American novelist
David Plastow (1932–2019), British businessman
David Pleat (born 1945), English football manager
David Pledger (born 1962), Australian artist
David M. Pletcher (1920–2004), American historian
David Plotz (born 1970), American journalist
David Plouffe (born 1967), American political strategist
David Plowden (born 1932), American photographer
David Pogue (born 1963), American writer
David Poile (born 1950), Canadian ice hockey executive
David Pole (1877–1952), British politician
David Pole (bishop) (??–1568), English bishop
David Pollack (born 1982), American football player
David Polonsky (born 1973), Ukrainian-Israeli illustrator
David Pomeranz (born 1951), American singer
David Pomeroy (born 1973), Canadian operatic tenor
David Pool (born 1966), American football player
David Poore (born 1966), British musician
David Popovici (born 2004), Romanian swimmer
David Popper (1843–1913), Bohemian cellist
David Portnoy (born 1977), American internet celebrity and businessman
David Powers (1912–1998), American military advisor
David Poythress (1943–2017), American politician
David M. Pozar (born 1952), American engineer
David Prager (born 1977), American tech executive
David Prall (1886–1940), American philosopher
David Pramik (born 1990), American music producer
David Praporgescu (1866–1916), Romanian general
David Preiss (born 1947), Czech-British mathematician
David Premack (1925–2015), American professor
David Prentice (1936–2014), English artist
David Pressman (born 1977), American diplomat
David L. Preston, American historian
David Pretot (born 1969), French skier
David Pretty (born 1951), Australian rules footballer
David W. Preus (1922–2021), American minister
David Prill (born 1959), American author
David Probert (born 1988), Welsh jockey
David Prosho (born 1965), English actor
David Proud (born 1983), English actor
David Proval (born 1942), American actor
David T. Provost (born 1972), American businessman
David Pruiksma (born 1957), American animator
David Prutton (born 1981), English footballer
David Pryce-Jones (born 1936), British author
David Pryke (born 1970), South African cricketer
David Pryor (born 1934), American politician
David William Pua (1836–1896), Hawaiian politician
David Puckett (born 1960), English footballer
David Puente, Spanish television producer
David Pujadas (born 1964), French journalist
David Cabrera Pujol (born 1989), Mexican footballer
David Pulkrabek (born 1993), Czech judoka
David Purley (1945–1985), British racing driver
David Endicott Putnam (1898–1918), American flying ace
David Puttnam (born 1941), British film producer
David Pyatt (born 1973), British musician
David Pybus (born 1970), British bassist
David E. I. Pyott (born 1953), British business executive

Q
David Qamaniq (born 1961), Canadian stage actor and politician 
David Quammen (born 1948), American writer
David Quantick (born 1961), English novelist, comedy writer and critic
David E. Quantock, American senior army officer
David Quarrey (born 1966), British diplomat
David Quayle (1936–2010), British businessman
David Quesada (born 1971), American soccer player
David Quessenberry (born 1990), American football player
David Querol (born 1989), Spanish footballer 
David Quibell (1879–1962), British builder and politician
David Quilter (born 1942), English actor
David Quirk (born 1981), Australian actor
David Quiroz (born 1982), Ecuadorian footballer

R
David Rabadán (born 2000), Spanish footballer
David Rabe (born 1940), American playwright
David Rabinowitch (born 1943), Canadian visual artist
David Rackley (born 1981), American baseball umpire
David Rader (born 1957), American football player and coach
David Radler (born 1944), Canadian executive
David Radner (1848–1901), Lithuanian writer and translator
David Rae (1724–1804), Scottish judge
David Ragan (born 1985), American stock car racing driver
David Ragsdale (born 1958), American violinist
David Raih (born 1980), American football coach
David Rainey (born 1968), American reality television personality
David Rakoff (1964–2012), American essayist
David Rakowski (born 1958), American composer
David Raksin (1912–2004), American composer
David Rall (1926–1999), American cancer specialist
David Ralston (1954–2022), American attorney and politician
David Ramadan (born 1970), Lebanese-American politician and businessman
David A Ramey (1939–2017), American artist
David G. Rand, American professor
David Randall (1951–2021), British journalist
David A. Randall (1905–1975), American book dealer
David Randitsheni (??–2009), South African rapist
David Ranz, American diplomat
David Rapaport (1911–1960), Hungarian clinical psychologist
David Rasche (born 1944), American actor
David Rasnick (born 1948), American biochemist
David Ratcliffe (born 1957), English-Australian footballer
David Ratcliffe (cricketer), British cricketer
David Ratford (born 1934), British translator and diplomat
David Rath (born 1965), Czech physician and politician
David Rattray (1958–2007), South African historian
David H. Raulet, American immunologist
David Raum (born 1998), German footballer
David A. Rausch (1947–2023), American author
David Rawlings (born 1969), American guitarist
David Rawson (1941–2020), American diplomat
David Raya (born 1995), Spanish footballer
David Raziel (1910–1941), Belarusian Zionist
David Ready, American film producer
David Reale (born 1984), Canadian actor
David Rebibo, American rabbi
David Recordon (born 1986), American technologist
David Reddaway (born 1953), British diplomat
David Redden (born 1949), American auctioneer
David Redfern (1936–2014), English photographer
David Redick (1753–1805), Irish-American lawyer
David Regis (born 1968), Martinican footballer
David Registe (born 1988), American-Dominican long-jumper
David Fukamachi Regnfors (born 1984), Swedish actor
David Rehling (1949–2021), Danish lawyer
David Reilly (1971–2005), American singer-songwriter
David Reimer (1965–2004), Canadian botched surgery victim
David Reis (born 1964), American politician
David Reivers (born 1958), American actor
David Oliver Relin (1962–2012), American journalist
David Relman, American microbiologist
David H. Remes (born 1954), American lawyer
David Remez (1886–1951), Israeli politician
David Remnick (born 1958), American journalist
David Renz, American professor
David Resnik (born 1962), American bioethicist
David Reutimann (born 1970), American stock car racing driver
David Reyes (born 1985), Chilean footballer
David Reynolds (born 1985), Australian racing drivers
David Reynoso (1926–1994), Mexican actor
David Rheem (born 1980), American poker player
David Rhoads (1932–2017), American cyclist
David Rhys-Jones (born 1962), Australian rules footballer
David Riazanov (1870–1938), Russian archivist
David Ricardo (1772–1823), British political economist
David Richman (born 1978), American basketball coach
David Rickels (born 1989), American mixed martial artist
David Ricketts (cyclist) (1920–1996), British cyclist
David Ricketts (musician) (born 1953), American musician
David Ridgen, Canadian filmmaker
David Ridley (born 1954), English cricketer
David Rieff (born 1952), American writer and policy analyst
David Riehm (born 1988), American writer
David Riesman (1909–2002), American sociologist
David Rigert (born 1947), Soviet weightlifter
David Riker (born 1963), American screenwriter
David Rikl (born 1971), Czech tennis player
David Rimmer (1942–2023), Canadian film director
David Rimoin (1936–2012), Canadian-American geneticist
David Ring (born 1953), American motivational speaker
David Rintoul (born 1948), Scottish actor
David Riolo (born 1972), Italian rugby league footballer
David Riordan, American media designer
David Bárcena Ríos (1941–2017), Mexican equestrian
David Ripley (born 1966), English cricket coach
David Risher (born 1965), American businessman
David Riske (born 1976), American baseball player
David Rittenhouse (1732–1796), American astronomer
David Rittich (born 1992), Czech ice hockey player
David Ritz (born 1943), American author
David Rivard (born 1953), American poet
David Rivera (born 1965), American politician
David Rivers (born 1965), American basketball player
David Rivers (American football) (born 1994), American football player
David B. Rivkin (born 1956), American attorney and political commentator
David Rizzio (1533–1566), Italian courtier
David Roback (1958–2020), American guitarist
David Robb (born 1947), Scottish actor
David Rocastle (1967–2001), English footballer
David Rocco (born 1970), Canadian executive producer
David Roche (1573–1635), Irish politician and magnate
David Rockefeller (1915–2017), American banker
David Rocker (born 1943), American hedge fund manager
David Rockwell (born 1956), American architect
David Rodan (born 1983), Fijian-Australian rules footballer
David Roddy (born 2001), American basketball player
David Roddy (law enforcement), American police chief
David Rodela (born 1986), American boxer
David Roderick (born 1970), American poet
David Rodigan (born 1951), British disc jockey
David Roditi (born 1973), Mexican tennis player and coach
David Rodman (born 1983), Slovenian ice hockey player
David Rodrigues (born 1991), Portuguese cyclist
David Roe (born 1965), English snooker player
David Roediger (born 1952), American professor
David S. Rohde (born 1967), American investigative journalist
David Rohl (born 1950), British Egyptologist
David Roitman (1884–1943), Russian-American composer
David Rokeach, American drummer
David Rokeby (born 1960), Canadian artist
David Roland (born 1930), American film producer
David Rollins (born 1989), American baseball player
David Romer (born 1958), American economist
David Romtvedt (born 1950), American poet
David Ron, Israeli cellular biochemist
David Ropeik (born 1951), American consultant
David Rorvik (born 1944), American journalist
David Rosa (born 1986), Portuguese mountain biker
David Rosebrook (1874–1937), American musician
David H. Rosmarin, American professor
David Rosowsky (born 1963), American engineer
David Rothbard (born 1964), American activist
David Rotenberg (1930–2022), Canadian politician
David Rotenberg (author) (born 1950), Canadian author
David Rothkopf (born 1955), American professor and journalist
David Rothman (medical historian) (1937–2020), American professor
David Rothman (statistician) (1935–2004), American statistician
David Rotundo (born 1991), Canadian blues player
David Roumieu (born 1981), French rugby union footballer
David Rounds (1930–1983), American actor
David Roundy, American physicist
David Rousseau (born 1960), British philosopher
David Rousset (1912–1997), French writer and political activist
David Rouzer (born 1972), American politician
David Rovics (born 1967), American singer-songwriter
David Rowe-Ham (1935–2020), British accountant
David Rowley, English music writer
David Rowley (footballer) (born 1990), Australian-Malaysian footballer
David Rubadiri (1930–2018), Malawian diplomat
David Rubinger (1924–2017), Israeli photographer
David Rubio (1934–2000), English instrument maker
David Rubio (coach) (born 1959), American volleyball coach
David Rubitsky (1917–2013), American veteran of World War II 
David Rudd (born 1959), American cinematographer
David Rudder (born 1953), Trinidadian calypsonian
David Sturtevant Ruder (1929–2020), American law professor
David Rudisha (born 1988), Kenyan middle-distance runner
David Rudman (born 1963), American puppeteer
David Rueda, American professor
David Ruelle (born 1935), Belgian mathematical physicist
David Ruffin (1941–1991), American singer
David Ruggerio (born 1962), American chef
David Ruggles (1810–1849), American abolitionist and printer
David Ruíz (1912–1994), Chilean footballer
David Runciman (born 1967), English political scientist
David Rundblad (born 1990), Swedish ice hockey player
David Rundqvist (born 1993), Swedish ice hockey player
David Rupert (born 1951), American intelligence agent
David Ruprecht (born 1948), American actor
David Rutherford-Jones (born 1951), British army officer
David Rutigliano (born 1965), American politician
David Ryall (1935–2014), English actor
David Ryu (born 1975), Korean-American politician

S
David Saad (born 1954), Lebanese judoka
David M. Sabatini (born 1968), American scientist and professor
David Sackett (1934–2015), American-Canadian physician
David Sacks, American television writer
David O. Sacks (born 1972), American entrepreneur
David Saelens (born 1975), Belgium race car driver  
David Safavian (born 1967), American lawyer and lobbyist
David Sage, American television actor
David Sagiv (1928–2019), Israeli linguist 
David Sahadi (born 1961), American multimedia producer
David Šain (born 1988), Croatian rower
David Saint (born 1963), American theatre director
David Saint-Jacques (born 1970), Canadian astronaut
David Saker (born 1966), Australian cricket coach
David Sakurai (born 1979), Japanese-Danish actor
David Sakvarelidze (born 1981), Ukrainian-Georgian politician
David Salle (born 1952), American painter
David Salo (born 1969), American linguist
David Salomons (1797–1873), British activist and baronet
David Salsburg (born 1931), American author
David Saltzberg (born 1967), American professor
David Salzman (born 1943), American television producer
David Sam (born 1933), American judge
David B. Samadi (born 1963), Iranian-American urologist
David Sammartino (born 1960), American wrestler and trainer
David Sammel (born 1961), South African tennis coach
David Samwell (1751–1798), Welsh naval surgeon and poet
David Sanborn (born 1945), American jazz alto saxophonist
David Sancious (born 1953), American musician
David B. Sandalow (born 1957), American policy expert
David F. Sandberg (born 1981), Swedish filmmaker
David Sandiford (born 1970), English cricketer
David Sandlin (born 1956), Northern Irish artist
David Sandström (born 1975), Swedish drummer
David Sanjek (1952–2011), American professor
David Sankey (1809–1884), American politician and tax collector
David Sanko, American community leader
David Santee (born 1957), American figure skater
David Santiago (born 1970), American politician
David Santisteban (born 2001), Spanish footballer
David Jhefer Domingues dos Santos (born 1999), Brazilian footballer 
David Sarnoff (1891–1971), Russian-American businessman
David Sarser (1921–2013), American musician
David Sassoli (1956–2022), Italian politician
David Sasson, Israeli diplomat
David Satcher (born 1941), American physician
David Sater (born 1947), American politician
David Satter (born 1947), American journalist
David M. Satterfield (born 1954), American diplomat
David Saul (1939–2017), Bermudian politician
David Savard (born 1990), Canadian ice hockey player
David Sawer (born 1961), British composer
David Sawyer, American politician
David Sawyier (1951–2019), American rower
David Sax (born 1979), Canadian journalist
David Saxe (born 1969), American theatre producer
David Saxe (judge) (born 1942), American judge
David S. Saxon (1920–2005), American physicist
David Scaife, Australian politician
David Scarboro (1968–1988), English actor
David Scarpa, American screenwriter
David Scase (1919–2003), British theatre director
David Scearce (born 1965), Canadian lawyer and screenwriter
David Schaal (born 1963), American-English actor
David Schaberg (born 1964), American academic
David Schley Schaff (1852–1941), American Presbyterian clergyman
David Schang, Scottish carpenter
David Schapira (born 1980), American politician
David S. Scharfstein (born 1960), American professor
David Scheffer (born 1953), American lawyer and diplomat
David Schenker (born 1968), American diplomat
David J. Schiappa (born 1962), American political staff member
David Schickele (1937–1999), American musician
David Schickler (born 1969), American screenwriter
David Schiff (born 1945), American composer
David Schimel (born 1955), American rocket engineer
David Schindler (1940–2021), Canadian-American limnologist
David Schippers (1929–2018), American lawyer
David Schirmer (1623–1686), German poet
David Schizer (born 1968), American lawyer and academic
David Schlemko (born 1987), Canadian ice hockey player
David A. Schlissel, American energy consultant
David Schlosberg (born 1963), American political theorist
David Schmader (born 1968), American writer
David Schmeidler (1939–2022), Israeli mathematician
David Schmidtz, Canadian-American philosopher
David P. Schmitt, American psychologist
David Schmoeller (born 1947), American film director
David Schnarch (1946–2020), American psychologist
David Schnaufer (1952–2006), American musician
David Schnell (born 1971), German painter
David Schnitter (born 1948), American saxophonist
David Schnoor (born 1961), American politician
David Schoen (born 1958), American attorney
David Schoenbrod, American professor
David Schoenbrun (1915–1988), American broadcast journalist
David Schomer (born 1956), British businessman and inventor
David J. Schow (born 1955), American author
David Schrader (born 1952), American harpsichordist
David Schubert (1913–1946), American poet
David Schuler (born 1982), American record producer
David Schuman (1944–2019), American judge
David Schuman (football analyst), American football executive and analyst
David Schurmann (born 1974), Brazilian director
David Schutter (1940–2005), Hawaii lawyer
David Schütter (born 1991), German actor
David M. Schwarz (born 1951), American architect
David Schwebel, American psychologist
David Schweickart (born 1942), American mathematician
David Schweikert (born 1962), American politician and businessman
David Schweiner (born 1994), Czech volleyball player
David Schwimmer (born 1966), American actor and director
David Schwimmer (banker) (born 1968/1969), American banker
David M. Scienceman, Australian scientist
David Scondras (1946–2020), American politician
David A. Score, American marine admiral
David Scowsill, British businessman
David Scrymgeour (born 1957), Canadian professor
David Seals (1947–2017), American writer
David Seaman (born 1963), English footballer
David Seamands (1922–2006), American author and Methodist leader
David Searle (1936–2021), Canadian politician
David Sedaris (born 1956), American essayist
David Seddon, British academic
David Segui (born 1966), Cuban-American baseball player
David Sehat, American academic
David Seisay (born 1967), Swedish-American songwriter
David Sejusa (born 1954), Ugandan lawyer
David Selberg (1995–2018), Swedish ice hockey player
David Selby (born 1941), American actor
David Self (born 1970), American screenwriter
David Sellar (1941–2019), Scottish heraldry regulator
David E. Sellers (born 1938), American architect
David Seltzer (born 1940), American screenwriter
David O. Selznick (1902–1965), American film producer
David Semel, American director and producer
David Semerad (born 1991), Filipino-Czech basketball player
David Moinina Sengeh, Sierra Leonean politician
David B. Sentelle (born 1943), American judge
David Sepkoski (born 1972), American professor and historian
David Sereda (born 1957), Canadian musician
David Serero (architect) (born 1974), French architect
David Serero (singer) (born 1981), Moroccan-French opera singer
David Servan-Schreiber (1961–2011), French physician
David Sesay (born 1998), English footballer
David Sessions, American politician
David Sevilla (born 1940), Mexican field hockey player
David Sewall (1735–1825), American judge
David Sewart, British professor
David Sewell (born 1977), New Zealand cricketer
David Shacklady (born 1967), English golfer
David Shackleton (1863–1938), British cotton worker civil servant
David Shae (born 1981), American actor
David Shaffer (born 1936), American professor
David Shahar (1926–1997), Israeli writer
David Shakarian (1914–1984), American businessman
David Shakow (1901–1981), American psychologist
David Shale (1932–2016), New Zealand-American mathematician
David Shalleck (born 1961), American chef
David Shambaugh (born 1953), American professor
David F. Shamoon, Canadian screenwriter
David Shankle (born 1967), American guitarist
David Shannon (born 1959), American writer and illustrator
David Shapell (1921–2015), Polish-American real estate developer
David Shapiro, multiple people
David Sharbani (1920–1985), Israeli-Colombian rabbi
David Sharp (mountaineer) (1972–2006), English mountaineer 
David Shatraw (born 1962), American actor
David Shaughnessy (born 1957), British actor and producer
David Shaw-Smith (1939–2021), Irish filmmaker
David Shayler (born 1965), British whistleblower
David Shearer (born 1957), New Zealand politician
David Shedd, American intelligence officer
David Shedden (1944–2017), Scottish rugby union footballer
David Sheehan (1938–2020), American broadcaster
David Sheff (born 1955), American author
David Sheffield (born 1948), American comedy writer
David Sheiner (born 1928), American actor
David Sheinkopf, American actor
David Sheldrick (1919–1977), Kenyan farmer
David Shelley (1957–2015), American musician
David Shenk (born 1966), American writer
David Shentow (1925–2017), Belgian-Canadian Holocaust survivor
David Sheppard (1929–2005), British bishop
David Sherer (born 1957), American physician
David Benjamin Sherry (born 1981), American photographer
David Sherwin (1942–2018), British screenwriter
David Shetzline (born 1934), American author
David Shields (born 1956), American writer and filmmaker
David Shifrin (born 1950), American clarinetist
David Shilling (born 1949), English sculptor
David Shillinglaw (born 1982), British artist
David Shillington (born 1983), Australian rugby union footballer
David Shimer, American historian and foreign policy analyst
David Shinar, Israeli researcher
David Shing (born 1970), Australian marketing executive
David H. Shinn (born 1940), American diplomat
David K. Shipler (born 1942), American author
David Shipley (born 1963), American journalist
David Shire (born 1937), American songwriter
David Shmoys (born 1959), American professor
David Shoebridge, Australian politician
David Shofet, Iranian-American rabbi
David Sholtz (1891–1953), American politician
David Shor, American data scientist
David Shore (born 1959), Canadian writer and television producer
David M. Shoup (1904–1983), American military general
David Showell (1924–1955), American fighter pilot
David Shreeve, English religious figure
David Shreeve (priest) (1934–2021), English priest
David M. Shribman, American journalist
David Shrier, American futurist
David Shrigley (born 1968), British visual artist
David Shterenberg (1881–1948), Ukrainian-Russian painter
David Shukman (born 1958), British journalist
David Shulkin (born 1959), American physician and government official
David Dean Shulman (born 1949), Israeli Indologist
David Shuster (born 1967), American television journalist
David Shute, British journalist
David Shute (ice hockey) (born 1971), American ice hockey player
David Shutt (1942—2020), British politician
David Sibeko (1938–1979), South African journalist
David Sidikman (born 1934), American lawyer and politician
David Sidoo (born 1959), Canadian businessman
David Albin Zywiec Sidor (1947–2020), American-Nicaraguan bishop
David Sidorsky (1927–2021), American professor
David Sidwick, British politician
David Sieck (born 1957), American politician
David Sieff (1939–2019), British businessman
David Silinde (born 1984), Tanzanian politician
David Sills (1938–2011), American jurist
David Sills (American football) (born 1996), American football player
David Silveria (born 1972), American drummer
David Silvers (born 1979), American politician
David Silverstein (1896–1944), American journalist
David Simão (born 1990), Portuguese footballer
David Simas (born 1970), American political figure
David Simbi, Zimbabwean engineer
David Simbo (born 1989), Sierra Leonean footballer
David Simchi-Levi (born 1955), American academic
David Thabo Simelane (born 1956), Swazi serial killer
David Eseli Simiyu (born 1958), Kenyan politician
David Simmonds, British politician
David J. Simms (1933–2018), Indian-Irish mathematician
David Singleton (born 1961), English record producer
David Alfaro Siqueiros (1896–1974), Mexican social realist painter
David Sirlin, American game designer
David Sirota (born 1975), American journalist
David J. Skal (born 1952), American historian and critic
David Skeel (born 1961), American professor
David Skegg (born 1947), New Zealand epidemiologist 
David Sklansky (born 1947), American poker player
David Sklenička (born 1996), Czech ice hockey player
David J. Skorton (born 1949), American physician
David Skover (born 1951), American professor
David Slack (born 1972), American television writer
David Slade (born 1969), British director
David R. Slavitt (born 1935), American writer
David Sleath, English businessman
David Sleet, American scientist
David Sloman (born 1961), English health service executive
David Small (born 1945), American writer
David Smerdon (born 1984), Australian chess grandmaster
David Smith (murderer) (born 1956), English murderer, rapist, and suspected serial killer
David Smith, multiple people
David Louis Sneddon (born 1980; disappeared 2004), American university student 
David Sneddon (born 1978), Scottish singer
David Snowdon (born 1952), American epidemiologist
David Snyder (born 1944), American production designer
David So (born 1987), Korean-American comedian and YouTuber
David Motta Soares (born 1997), Brazilian ballet dancer
David Sobel (born 1949), American academic
David Sobolov (born 1964), Canadian voice actor
David L. Sokol (born 1956), American business executive
David Solans (born 1996), Spanish film and television actor
David Somerset (1928–2017), English peer and landowner
David Somerset (banker) (1930–2014), English banker
David Sonenberg, American music manager
David Sonin (1935–2008), English music critic and arts journalist 
David A. Sonnenfeld (born 1953), American sociologist
David Sopher (1929–2019), Indian water polo player
David Soria (born 1993), Spanish footballer
David Sosa, American philosopher
David Sosebee (born 1955), American NASCAR driver
David Soskice (born 1942), British economist
David Sosnowski (born 1959), American novelist
David Soto (born 1993), Spanish footballer
David Soul (born 1943), British-American actor and singer
David Sousa (born 1980), Spanish footballer
David Souter (born 1939), American Justice of the Supreme Court
David Soyer (1923–2010), American cellist
David Spade (born 1964), American actor and television host
David Spangler (born 1945), American philosopher
David Spears (born 1963), Canadian cyclist
David Spedding (1943–2001), British intelligence officer
David Speedie (born 1960), Scottish footballer
David Speirs (born 1984), Australian politician
David Spergel (born 1961), American theoretical astrophysicist
David Spero (born 1951), American music manager
David Spiegel (born 1945), American cancer researcher
David Spiegelhalter (born 1953), British statistician
David Spielberg (1939–2016), American actor
David Špiler (born 1983), Slovenian handball player
David Spiller (1942–2018), British artist
David Spiller (politician), American politician
David Spindler, American scholar
David Spinozza (born 1949), American guitarist
David Spinx (born 1951), English actor
David Spivak (born 1978), American mathematician
David Spofforth (born 1961), English footballer
David Spriggs (born 1981), Australian rules footballer
David Spring (1872–1947), Australian politician
David Sproxton (born 1954), English animator
David Squires (composer) (born 1957), Canadian composer
David Squires (cartoonist) (born 1974), English cartoonist
David Stack (1957–1976), American murder victim
David Derek Stacton (1923–1968), American novelist
David H. Staelin (1938–2011), American astronomer
David Stagg (born 1983), Australian rugby league footballer
David Stahel (born 1975), New Zealand historian
David Staller (born 1955), American theatre director
David Staples (born 1953), Barbadian sailor
David Starkey (born 1945), English historian
David L. Starling, American businessman
David Starzyk (born 1961), American actor
David Stav (born 1960), Israeli rabbi
David Stearns (born 1985), American baseball executive
David Steel, (born 1938), English politician
David A. Steen, American conservation biologist
Davíð Stefánsson (1895–1964), Icelandic poet
David Steffen (born 1971), American politician and businessman
David Steindl-Rast (born 1926), American monk
David Steinhart, American singer-songwriter
David B. Steinman (1886–1960), American civil engineer
David Stenn, American television writer
David Stensrud (born 1961), American meteorologist
David Stenstrom (born 1953), American actor
David Sterling (born 1958), Northern Irish civil servant
David Stern (1942–2020), American basketball executive
David Stephan, Canadian social figure
David Stephen (born 1951), South African cricketer
David Steward (born 1951), American businessman
David Ogden Stiers (1942–2018), American actor and conductor
David Stiff (born 1984), English cricketer
David Stiff (basketball) (born 1972), Australian basketball player
David St. James (born 1947), American actor
David St. John (born 1949), American poet
David Stockdale (born 1985), English footballer
David Stockman (born 1946), American politician and businessman
David Stockton (born 1991), American basketball player
David Stoddart (1926–2020), British politician
David Stoll (born 1952), American anthropologist
David Stollery (born 1941), American actor
David Storey (1933–2017), English playwright
David Storl (born 1990), German shot-putter 
David Stouck (born 1940), Canadian literary critic and biographer
David Stoupakis (born 1974), American artist
David Stout (1942–2020), American journalist
David Stove (1927–1994), Australian philosopher
David Stoyanov (born 1991), Bulgarian footballer
David Straiton, American television director
David Strand (born 1949), American professor
David Strangeways (1912–1998), British Colonel
David Strangway (1934–2016), Canadian geophysicist
David Stras (born 1974), American judge
David Strassman (born 1957), American ventriloquist
David Strathairn (born 1949), American actor
David Stratton (born 1939), English-Australian film critic
David Strauss (1808–1874), German theologian
David Street (1917–1971), American actor
David Strelec (born 2001), Slovak footballer
David Stremme (born 1977), American stock car racing driver
David Strettell, American bookstore owner
David Strettle (born 1983), English rugby union footballer
David Strickland (1969–1999), American actor
David Stride (1958–2016), English footballer
David Střihavka (born 1983), Czech footballer
David Stringer, American attorney and politician 
David Stromeyer (born 1946), American sculptor
David Stronach (1931–2020), British archaeologist
David Strooper (born 1968), Australian rules footballer
David Stubbs (born 1962), British music journalist
David Stupich (1921–2006), Canadian legislator
David Stuurman (1773–1830), South African Khoi chief
David Stypka (1979–2021), Czech singer-songwriter
David Suazo (born 1979), Honduran footballer
David Suchet (born 1946), English actor
David Sugarbaker (1953–2018), American physician
David Suhor (born 1968), American musician
David Sumner, American mathematician
David Susskind (1920–1987), American producer
David Sutcliffe (born 1969), Canadian-American actor
David Suzuki (born 1936), Japanese-Canadian environmental scientist
David Švagrovský (born 1984), Czech hockey player
David Švehlík (born 1972), Czech actor
David Svensson (born 1984), Swedish footballer 
David Sviben (born 1989), Slovenian footballer 
David Svoboda (born 1985), Czech pentathlon athlete 
David Lowry Swain (1801–1868), American politician
David Swann (born 1949), Canadian doctor and politician
David Swanson (born 1969), American activist and author
David F. Swensen (1954–2021), American investor and philanthropist 
David Swerdlick, American journalist
David Swinney (1946–2006), American psycholinguist
David Swinton, American economist
David R. Syiemlieh (born 1953), Indian academic
David Sylvester (1924–2001), British art critic
David Sylvian (born 1958), English singer-songwriter
David Symonds (born 1943), English disc jockey
David Syrett (1939–2004), American historian
Dávid Szabó, Hungarian volleyball player 
David Szalay (born 1974), Hungarian-English writer
David Sze (born 1966), American entrepreneur
Dávid Szintai (born 1997), Hungarian tennis player
David Sztybel (born 1967), Canadian philosopher 
David Szurman (born 1981), Czech ice dancer

T
David Tabak (1927–2012), Israeli runner
David Tabizel (born 1965), British entrepreneur
David Tabor (1913–2005), British physicist
David H. Tabor, American Air Force general
David Tacey, Australian writer and intellectual
David M. Tait (born 1947), Scottish airline executive
David E. Talbert (born 1966), American playwright
David Talbot (born 1951), American entrepreneur
David Talbot Rice (1903–1972), English art historian
David Talerico (born 1956), American politician
David Talley (born 1950), American prelate
David Tallichet (1922–2007), American businessman
David Tanabe (born 1980), American ice hockey player
David W. Tandy (born 1972), American politician
David Tanenbaum (born 1956), American guitarist
David W. Tank, American molecular biologist
David Tang (1954–2017), Hong Kong businessman
David Tao, (born 1969), Taiwanese singer-songwriter
David Tarnas, American politician
David S. Tatel (born 1942), American jurist
David Taubman, Australian electrical engineer
David Tavares (born 1999), Portuguese footballer
David Taylor, multiple people
David Tecchler (1666–1748), German luthier
David Teece (born 1948), New Zealand theorist
David Teegarden, American musician
David Tejada (1929–2018), Peruvian physician
David Temple, British conductor
David Temple (trade unionist) (1862–1921), Australian trade unionist
David Templeman (born 1965), Australian politician
David Teoh (born 1955), Australian businessman
David Tepper (born 1957), American businessman and sports owner
David Terans (born 1994), Uruguayan footballer
David Terrien (born 1976), French racing driver
David Terrier (born 1973), French footballer
David Terteryan (born 1997), Armenian footballer
David Testo (born 1981), American soccer player
David Texeira (born 1991), Uruguayan footballer
David Teymur (born 1989), Swedish mixed martial artist
David Thai (born 1956), Vietnamese-American gang leader
David Cruz Thayne (born 1971), American businessman
David Thesmar, French economist
David Thewlis (born 1963), English actor, writer and director
David Thibault (born 1997), French-Canadian singer
David Thodey (born 1954), Australian businessman
David J. Tholen (born 1955), American astronomer
David Thorns (1943–2020), New Zealand sociologist
David Thorstad (1941–2021), American political activist
David J. Thouless (1934–2019), British physicist
David Threlfall (born 1953), English actor
David Thrussell (born 1961), Australian musician
David Thulin (born 1983), Swedish music producer
David Thwaites (born 1976), British actor
David Tibet (born 1960), British poet
David Tickle (born 1959), British record producer
David Tijanić (born 1997), Slovenian footballer
David Timor (born 1989), Spanish footballer
David Tindle (born 1932), British painter
David Tineo (born 1955), American artist
David Tipper (born 1976), British composer
David A. Tirrell (born 1953), American chemist
David Tisch (born 1981), American businessman
David Tischman, American comic book writer
David Titcher, American screenwriter
David Tkachuk (born 1945), Canadian teacher and politician
David Tkebuchava (born 1991), Russian footballer 
David Tkeshelashvili (born 1969), Georgian politician 
David Tlale (born 1975), South African fashion designer
David Tod (1805–1868), American politician and industrialist
David Toews (born 1990), Canadian ice hockey player
David Toguri (1933–1997), Japanese-Canadian choreographer
David Toland, American politician
David Tolbert (born 1956), American prosecutor
David Toledo (born 1982), Mexican footballer
David F. Tolin (born 1968), American psychologist
David Tom (born 1978), American actor
David Tomassini (born 2000), Sammarinese footballer
David Tomassoni (1952–2022), American politician
David Tomaszewski (born 1984), French music director
David Toms (born 1967), American golfer
David L. Toney (1857–2014), American politician
David Tonoyan (born 1967), Armenian politician
David Kimutai Too (1968–2008), Kenyan politician
David Toop (born 1949), English musician
David Torrence (1864–1951), Scottish actor
David Torrence (athlete) (1985–2017), Peruvian-American runner
David Torres (footballer, born 1986), Spanish footballer
David Torres (footballer, born 2003), Spanish footballer
David Torn (born 1953), American guitarist
David Toska (born 1975), Norwegian bank robber
Dávid Tóth (born 1986), Hungarian canoeist
David Toups (born 1971), American prelate
David S. Touretzky, American research professor
David Toussaint (born 1964), American writer
David Town (born 1976), English footballer
David Trachtenberg, American national security consultant
David Tracy (born 1939), American theologian
David G. Trager (1937–2011), American judge
David Trainer, American television director
David Traktovenko (born 1956), Russian businessman and sports owner
David A. Trampier (1954–2014), American artist
David Travis (born 1949), American politician
David Traylor (born 1943), English cricketer
David Treacy (born 1989), Irish hurler
David Treadwell (born 1965), American football player
David Treasure (born 1950), English rugby league footballer
David Treasure (politician) (1943–2018), Australian politician
David Trefgarne (born 1941), British politician
David Tremayne (born 1942), British motor racing journalist
David Tremblay (born 1987), Canadian wrestler
David Tremlett (born 1945), English-Swiss sculptor
David Trench (1915–1988), British army officer
David Tress (born 1955), British artist
David Treuer (born 1970), American writer
David Trewhella (born 1962), Australian rugby union footballer
David Trezeguet (born 1977), French footballer
David Trim (born 1969), Indian historian
David Trimble (1944–2022), Northern Irish politician
David Trinidad (born 1953), American poet
David Trivunic (born 2001), German footballer
David Trobisch (born 1958), German scholar
David Trone (born 1955), American businessman and politician
David Trottier, American screenwriter
David Troughton (born 1950), English actor
David Trout (born 1957), American football player
David True (born 1942), American painter
David Trueba (born 1969), Spanish novelist
David Trujillo (born 1976), American businessman
David Truman (1913–2003), American academic
David Trumble (born 1986), British director
David Trumbull (1819–1889), American missionary
David Trummer (born 1994), Australian biker
David Truong (1945–2014), Vietnamese protestor
David Tse, Hong Kong professor
David Tsebe (born 1966), South African runner
David Tshama (born 1996), Congolese boxer
David Tsimakuridze (1925–2006), Georgian wrestler
David Tso, Hong Kong lawn bowler
David Tsorayev (born 1983), Georgian footballer 
David Tsubouchi (born 1951), Japanese-Canadian politician 
David Tsugio Tsutada (1906–1971), Japanese cleric
David Tua (born 1972), New Zealand boxer
David Tubridy (born 1980), Irish Gaelic footballer
David Tudor (1926–1996), American pianist
David Tukhmanov (born 1940), Soviet composer
David Tukiçi (born 1956), Albanian composer
David Tůma (born 1991), Czech ice hockey player
David Tune (born 1954), Australian public servant
David Turk, American attorney and politician
David Tustin (born 1935), English bishop
David Tutera (born 1966), American wedding planner
David Tutonda (born 1995), Congolese footballer
David Tuveson (born 1966), American biologist
David Tweed, Australian businessman
David Tweh (born 1998), Liberian footballer
David E. Twiggs (1790–1862), American army officer
David Twohill (born 1954), Australian musician
David Twohy (born 1955), American film director
David Twomey (born 1961), Australian rules footballer
David Tyack (1930–2016), American professor
David Tyacke (1915–2010), English army officer 
David Tyavkase (born 1984), Nigerian footballer
David Tyree (born 1980), American football player
David Tyshler (1927–2014), Soviet saber fencer
David Tyson, Canadian musician
David Tzur (born 1959), Israeli politician and policeman 
David Tzuriel (born 1946), Israeli psychologist

U
David King Udall (1851–1938), American politician
David Uhl (born 1961), American artist
David Vogel Uihlein Jr., American businessman
David Ukleba (1919–1999), Georgian geographer
David Ulch, American rugby league footballer
David Ulibarri, American politician
David C. Ulich, American film producer
David Ullström (born 1989), Swedish ice hockey player
David Ulm (born 1984), French footballer
David Umaru (born 1959), Nigerian politician
David Unaipon (1872–1967), Australian author
David Underdown (1925–2009), English historian
David Ungar, American computer scientist
David Unruh, American football coach 
David Unsworth (born 1973), English footballer
David Uosikkinen (born 1956), American drummer
David Upshal, British television producer 
David Upson (born 1962), British canoeist 
David Urban (born 1964), American lobbyist 
David Ure (1749–1798), Scottish geologist
David Herrera Urias, American lawyer
David Urie, American corporate executive
David Urwitz (born 1973), Swedish singer and musician 
David Ury (born 1973), American comedian and actor
David Usher (born 1966), British singer-songwriter
David Ushery (born 1967), American news anchor
David Ussishkin (born 1935), Israeli archaeologist and professor
David UU (1948–1994), Canadian poet 
David Uwins (1780–1837), English physician and medical writer  
David Uzochukwu (born 1998), Australian-Nigerian photographer

V
David Vadim (born 1972), Ukrainian-American boxer and actor
David Vaealiki (born 1980), New Zealand rugby league player 
David Valadao (born 1977), American politician and farmer
David Valero (born 1988), Spanish mountain biker
David Vamplew (born 1987), Scottish poker player
David Van (born 1964), Australian politician
David Vanacore, American composer
David Van Alstyne (1897–1985), American politician
David M. Van Buren, American politician
David van Dantzig (1900–1959), Dutch mathematician
David Van Day (born 1956), English singer
David van de Kop (1937–1994), Dutch painter
David Van De Pitte (1941–2009), American music arranger
David Vanderbilt, American professor
David Van der Gulik (born 1983), Canadian ice hockey player
David van der Kellen Jr. (1804–1879), Dutch engraver
David van der Knaap (born 1948), South African cricketer
David van der Poel (born 1992), Belgian-Dutch cyclist
David Vanderpool (born 1960), American medical missionary
David Vandervelde, American songwriter
David VanDrunen (born 1971), American professor
David Van Essen (born 1945), American neuroscientist
David VanHoose (born 1957), American professor
David Vanian (born 1956), English musician
David Van Kriedt (1922–1994), American composer
David VanLanding (1964–2015), American singer
David Van Leer (1949–2013), American educator
David Vanole (1963–2007), American soccer player
David Van Os (1950–2023), American attorney and politician 
David Van Reybrouck (born 1971), Belgian historian
David Vanterpool (born 1973), American basketball player and coach
David Van Tieghem (born 1955), American composer
David E. Van Zandt (born 1953), American attorney and academic administrator
David van Zanten (born 1982), Irish footballer
David Varela (canoeist) (born 1993), Portuguese canoeist
David Vasquez (born 1948), American boxer
David Vaudreuil (born 1966), American soccer player
David Vaver (born 1946), Czech-American lawyer
David Vavruška (born 1972), Czech football coach
Dávid Vecsernyés (born 1991), Hungarian artistic gymnast
David Veesler, French biochemist
David Veikune (born 1985), American football player
David Vela, American park administrator
David Velásquez (born 1989), Honduran footballer
David Venable (born 1978), American intelligence officer
David Venable (TV personality) (born 1964), American television personality
David Vendetta (born 1968), French disc jockey
David Verburg (born 1991), American track and field athlete
David Verdaguer (born 1983), Spanish actor
David Verser (born 1958), American football player
David Vest (born 1943), American piano player
David Vestal (1924–2013), American photographer
David Vetter (1971–1984), American clinical patient
David Vetter (farmer), American farmer
David Viaene (born 1965), American football player
David Vickery (born 1977), British visual effects supervisor
David Vidal (born 1950), Spanish footballer manager
David Vidal (baseball) (born 1989), Puerto Rican baseball player
Davíð Viðarsson (born 1984), Icelandic footballer
David Vigliano (born 1959), American literary agent
David Vigneault, Canadian civil servant
David Villa (born 1981), Spanish footballer
David Villalba (born 1982), Paraguayan footballer
David Villalpando (born 1959), Mexican actor
David Vine (1935–2009), English television sports presenter
David Vines (born 1949), Australian economist
David Viniar (born 1955), American business executive
David Virelles (born 1983), Cuban pianist
David Virgin (born 1962), Irish-Australian musician
David Viscott (1938–1996), American psychiatrist
David Visentin (born 1965), Canadian actor and realtor
David Vitek (born 1974), Australian entrepreneur
David Vitter (born 1961), American lobbyist
David Julián Levecq Vives (born 1984), Spanish swimmer 
David Viviano (born 1971), American judge
David Vladeck (born 1951), American government executive
David Vlahov (born 1952), American epidemiologist
David Vlok (born 1963), South African actor
David Voas (born 1955), American social scientist
David Vobora (born 1986), American football player
Dávid Vojvoda (born 1990), Hungarian basketball player
David Volek (born 1966), Czech ice hockey player
David Von Ancken (1964–2021), American screenwriter
David von Ballmoos (born 1994), Swiss footballer
David Von Drehle (born 1961), American author
David Von Erich (1958–1984), American wrestler
David von Grafenberg, French novelist
David von Krafft (1655–1724), German-Swedish painter
David von Schlegell (1920–1992), American sculptor
David Vrankovic (born 1993), Australian footballer 
David Vrbata (born 1983), Czech ice hockey player 
David Vržogić (born 1989), German footballer
David Vseviov (born 1949), Estonian historian
David Vuillemin (born 1977), French motocross racer
David Vunagi (born 1950), Solomon Islands Anglican bishop
David Výborný (born 1975), Czech ice hockey player 
David Vychodil (born 1980), Czech ice hockey player
David Vygodsky (1893–1943), Russian literary critic

W
David Wachman (born 1971), Irish racehorse trainer
David Wachs (born 1980), American actor
David Waddington (1929–2017), British politician
David Waddington (Essex MP) (1810–1863), English politician
David Wagenfuhr (born 1982), American soccer player
David Wager (1804–1870), American politician
David Wagner (tennis), (born 1974), American wheelchair tennis player
David Wagoner (1926–2021), American poet
David Wain (born 1969), American actor and comedian
David Waisman (born 1937), Peruvian politician
David B. Wake (1936–2021), American professor
David Wakikona (born 1950), Ugandan aviator and politician
David Waksberg (born 1956), American activist
David S. Walbridge (1802–1868), American politician
David Wald (born 1973), American voice actor
David Walentas (born 1939), American real estate developer
David Wallace-Wells, American journalist
David Walliams (born 1971), English comedian
David Walters (born 1951), American politician
David Walters (swimmer) (born 1987), American swimmer
David Waltz (1943–2012), American computer scientist
David Wanigasekera (1860-1955), Sri Lankan Sinhala businessman and politician
David Wanklyn (1911–1942), British military officer
David Wansbrough (born 1965), Australian field hockey player
David Warbeck (1941–1997), New Zealand actor
David Warburton (born 1965), British composer and politician
David Warfield (1866–1951), American stage actor
David Warner (born 1986), Australian cricket player
David Warrilow (1934–1995), English actor
David Warsh (born 1944), American journalist
David Warshofsky (born 1961), American actor
David Warsofsky (born 1990), American ice hockey player
David Washbrook (1948–2021), British historian
David Washington (born 1990), American baseball player
David Watford (born 1993), American football player
David Watkin (1941–2018), British architectural historian
David Watmough (1926–2017), Canadian playwright
David Waxman, American disc jockey
David Wear (born 1990), American basketball player
David Weatherall (1933–2018), British physician
David Weatherley (born 1939), English-New Zealand actor
David Weathers (born 1969), American baseball player
David Weaver (born 1987), American basketball player
David Webber (born 1955), American information technology expert
David Webb (Hong Kong activist) (born 1965), activist investor, share market analyst and retired investment banker based in Hong Kong
David Kenyon Webster (1922–1961?), American soldier, journalist and author
David Wechsler (1896–1891), Romanian-American psychologist
David Wecht (born 1962), American attorney and jurist
David Weddle, American television writer
David Wehner, American corporate executive
David Weigel (born 1981), American journalist
David Weil, American economist
David Weiner, American editor
David A. Weiner, American filmmaker
David Weinberg (born 1952), American rower
David Weinberger (born 1950), American author
David Weisman (1942–2019), American film producer
David Weissman, American screenwriter
David Weissman (documentary filmmaker), American filmmaker
David Welker (born 1964), American painter
David E. Wellbery (born 1947), American professor
David Weller (born 1957), Jamaican track cyclist
David Welter, American politician
David Wendell, American professor
David Wengrow (born 1972), British archaeologist
David Wenham (born 1965), Australian actor
David Wenlock (born 1959), English cricketer
David Wenzel (born 1950), American illustrator
David Weprin (born 1956), American politician
David Were, Kenyan politician
David Wesely (born 1945), American board game designer
David Wesley (born 1970), American basketball player
David Wessel (born 1954), American journalist
David Westin (born 1952), American television personality
David Wetherall (born 1971), English footballer
David James Wetherall, American engineer
David Wetzel, American historian
David Wevill (born 1935), Japanese-Canadian poet
David Wharton (born 1969), American  swimmer
David Whatley (born 1966), American corporate executive
David Wheadon (born 1948), Australian rules footballer
David John Wheal (1851–1904), Australian businessman
David Wheater (born 1987), English footballer
David Wheaton (born 1969), American radio host
David Whelan (golfer) (born 1961), English golfer
David A. Whetten (born 1946), American theorist
David F. Wherley Jr. (1947–2009), American general
David Whigham (1832–1906), Scottish cricketer
David Whitehouse (1941–2013), British archaeologist
David Whitehurst (born 1955), American football player
David Whitelaw (1875–1970), British writer
David Whiteley (born 1977), British television presenter
David A. Whiteley (1944–2017), American horse trainer
David Whitfield (1925–1980), British vocalist
David Whitley (born 1984), British author
David Whitley (politician), American politician
David W. Whitlock, American academic administrator
David Whitmer (1805–1888), American author
David Whitmore (born 1967), American football player
David Whitney (1939–2005), American art curator
David Whyte (footballer) (1971–2014), English footballer
David Whyte (poet) (born 1955), English poet
David Widdicombe (1962–2017), Canadian filmmaker
David Widdicombe (QC) (1924–2019), British political activist
David Wiegand (1947–2018), American journalist
David Wiens (born 1964), American cross-country bike racer
David Wiese (born 1985), South African cricketer
David Wiesner (born 1956), American illustrator
David Wiffen (born 1942), English-Canadian singer-songwriter
David Wiggins (born 1933), English philosopher
David Wijnkoop (1876–1941), Dutch political leader
David Wijns (born 1987), Belgian footballer
David Wikaira-Paul (born 1985), New Zealand actor
David Wikander (1884–1955), Swedish musicologist
David Wike (born 1969), American actor
David Wilczewski (1952–2009), American-Swedish jazz saxophonist
David Wild (born 1961), American writer and critic
David Wildstein (born 1961), American businessman and politician
David Wildt (1950–2020), American biologist
David Wilhelm (born 1956), American political figure
David Wilkerson (1931–2011), American evangelist
David Wilkes (born 1947), British minister
David Wilks (born 1959), Canadian politician
David Willardson, American artist
David Willcocks (1919–2015), British choral conductor
David Willetts (born 1956), British politician and life peer 
David William (1926–2010), British-Canadian actor
David Willoughby (1931–1998), English priest
David Willsie (born 1968), Canadian Paralympic rugby footballer
David Wilmot (1814–1868), American politician
David Wilmot (actor), Irish actor
David Wilshire (born 1943), British politician
David Wilstein (1928–2017), American real estate developer
David Wiltse (born 1940), American novelist
David J. Wineland (born 1944), American physicist
David Winfield (conservator) (1929–2013), British conservator
David Wingrove (born 1954), British writer
David Winnie (born 1966), Scottish footballer
David Winning (born 1961), Canadian-American director
David Wippman (born 1954), American academic administrator
David Wiseman (born 1981), American artist
David Wisniewski (1953–2002), American writer
David Wittig (born 1955), American corporate executive
David Witts (born 1991), British actor
David Wojnarowicz (1954–1992), Polish-American painter
David Wolfson, Baron Wolfson of Tredegar (born 1968), British politician
David Wolfson, Baron Wolfson of Sunningdale (1935–2021), British politician
David Wolkowsky (1919–2018), American real estate developer
David Wolman, American journalist
David Wolpe (born 1958), American rabbi
David L. Wolper (1928–2010), American producer
David Wolpert, American mathematician
David Wolstencroft (born 1969), British-American screenwriter
David Woodard (born 1964), American businessman
David Woodbury, American politician
David Woodcock (1785–1835), American lawyer and politician
David Woodcock (musician), English singer-songwriter
David Woodfield (born 1943), English footballer
David Woodhouse, American architect
David Woodhouse (priest) (born 1949), English priest
David Woodley (1958–2003), American football player
David Woodworth (1939–1994), Irish priest
David Wootton, British lawyer and politician
David Wootton (historian) (born 1952), British historian
David Worby, American lawyer
David Worthington (sculptor) (born 1962), British sculptor
David Wratt (born 1949), New Zealand climate scientist
David Wroblewski (born 1959), American novelist
David R. Wrone (born 1933), American academic
David Wurmser, Swiss-American foreign policy specialist
David Wyman (1929–2018), American author
David Wyndorf (born 1956), American singer-songwriter
David Wynn (1972–2015), Canadian police officer
David Wysong (born 1949), American politician

X
David Xiao (born 1960). Chinese-Canadian businessman and politician  
David Ximenes (1777–1848), British army officer

Y
David Yaari (born 1969), American-Israeli entrepreneur
David Yacovone, American politician
David Yale (1928–2021), English legal scholar 
David Yallop (1937–2018), British author 
David Yalof, American academic
David Yakobashvili (born 1957), Georgian entrepreneur
David Yancey (born 1972), American politician
David Yankey (born 1992), Australian-American football player
David Yarnold (born 1952), American naturalist
David Yarritu, American musician
David Yarrow (born 1966), British photographer
David Yates (born 1963), British film director 
David Yau Yau, South Sudanese politician
David Yazbek (born 1961), American writer
David Yeagley (1951–2014), American composer
David Yee (born 1977), Canadian actor
David Yellin (1864–1941), Israeli educator and politician 
David Yencken (1931–2019), Australian businessman
David Yerushalmi (born 1956), American lawyer
David Yetman (born 1941), American academic
David Yeung, Hong Kong entrepreneur
David Yewdall (1950–2017), American sound mixer 
David Yezzi (born 1966), American poet
David Zink Yi (born 1973), Peruvian artist
David Yip (born 1951), British actor
David B. Yoffie (born 1954), American professor
David Yonggi Cho (1936–2021), South Korean minister
David Yontef, American television personality
David Yoo (born 1974), American writer
David Yow (born 1960), American musician and actor
David Yu (born 1967), American entrepreneur
David Yudelman, South African-Canadian writer 
David Yuengling (1808–1877), American businessman
David Z. T. Yui (1882–1936), Chinese religious figure
David Levy Yulee (1810–1886), American politician
David Yurchenko (born 1986), Armenian footballer 
David Yurdiga (born 1964), Canadian politician 
David Yurkovich (born 1964), American comic artist and writer

Z
David T. Zabecki (born 1947), American historian
David Zabel (born 1966), American television producer
David Zábranský (born 1977), Czech writer
David Zabriskie (born 1979), American cyclist
David Zabriskie (wrestler) (born 1986), American wrestler
David Zafer (1934–2019), Canadian violinist
David Zaffiro, American guitarist
David Zaharakis (born 1990), Greek Australian rules footballer
David Záizar (1930–1982), Mexican singer
David Zakai (1886–1978), Belariusian-Israeli journalist
David Zalkaliani (born 1968), Georgian diplomat 
David Zalzman (born 1996), Venezuelan footballer 
David Zarefsky (born 1946), American scholar
David Zarifa, Canadian academic
David Zaslav (born 1960), American business executive
David Zatezalo (born 1955), American corporate executive
David Zawada (born 1990), German mixed martial artist
David Zayas (born 1962), Puerto Rican actor
David Zdrilic (born 1974), Australian footballer
David Zec (born 2000), Slovenian footballer
David Zed (born 1960), American actor
David Zeisberger (1721–1808), Moravian clergyman and missionary
David Zellner (born 1974), American film director
David Zennie (born 1988), American director
David Zepeda (born 1973), Mexican actor and model
David Zhuang (born 1963), Chinese-American table tennis player
David Zhu (born 1990), Chinese race car driver 
David Zinczenko (born 1969), American publisher
David Zindell (born 1952), American writer
David Zink (born 1991), Austrian footballer
David Zinman (born 1936), American conductor and violinist
David Zinn, American costume designer
David Zippel (born 1954), American theatre director
David Zitelli (born 1968), French footballer
David Zollo (born 1969), American singer-songwriter
David Zonshine, American talent manager
David Zoppetti (born 1962), Swiss-Japanese writer 
David Vumlallian Zou (born 1977), American historian
David Zoubek (born 1974), Czech footballer
David Zowie (born 1981), English disc jockey
David Zubik (born 1949), American prelate
David Zucchino, American journalist
David Zucker (born 1947), American film director
David zum Brunnen (born 1963), American actor
David Zurabishvili (born 1957), Georgian politician
David Zurawik (born 1949), American journalist
David Zurutuza (born 1986), Spanish-French footballer 
Dávid Zvara (born 1994), Hungarian footballer 
David E. Zweifel (born 1934), American diplomat
David Zwilling (born 1949), Austrian skier 
David Zwirner (born 1964), German art dealer 
David Zwonitzer (born 1953), American politician

Disambiguation pages

*
David I (disambiguation), multiple people
David II (disambiguation), multiple people
David III (disambiguation), multiple people
David IV (disambiguation), multiple people
David V (disambiguation), multiple people
King David (disambiguation), multiple people

A
David Abbott (disambiguation), multiple people
David Abraham (disambiguation), multiple people
David Abrahams (disambiguation), multiple people
David Adam (disambiguation), multiple people
David Adams (disambiguation), multiple people
David Adler (disambiguation), multiple people
David Affengruber (disambiguation), multiple people 
David Alexander (disambiguation), multiple people
David Allen (disambiguation), multiple people
David Álvarez (disambiguation), multiple people
David Ames (disambiguation), multiple people
David Anderson (disambiguation), multiple people
David Andersson (disambiguation), multiple people
David Andrews (disambiguation), multiple people
David Anthony (disambiguation), multiple people
David Armitage (disambiguation), multiple people
David Armstrong (disambiguation), multiple people
David Arnold (disambiguation), multiple people
David Arnot (disambiguation), multiple people
David Ash (disambiguation), multiple people
David Atkinson (disambiguation), multiple people
David Austin (disambiguation), multiple people
David Axelrod (disambiguation), multiple people

B
David Bach (disambiguation), multiple people
David Bacon (disambiguation), multiple people
David Bailey (disambiguation), multiple people
David Bainbridge (disambiguation), multiple people
David Baird (disambiguation), multiple people
David Baker (disambiguation), multiple people
David Ball (disambiguation), multiple people
David Banks (disambiguation), multiple people
David Barlow (disambiguation), multiple people
David Barnes (disambiguation), multiple people
David Barnett (disambiguation), multiple people
David Barr (disambiguation), multiple people
David Barrett (disambiguation), multiple people
David Barry (disambiguation), multiple people
David Barton (disambiguation), multiple people
David Bass (disambiguation), multiple people
David Bates (disambiguation), multiple people
David Beaty (disambiguation), multiple people
David Bednar (disambiguation), multiple people
David Bell (disambiguation), multiple people
David Bennett (disambiguation), multiple people
David Benoit (disambiguation), multiple people
David Bentley (disambiguation), multiple people
David Berger (disambiguation), multiple people
David Berman (disambiguation), multiple people
David Bernard (disambiguation), multiple people
David Bernstein (disambiguation), multiple people
David Berry (disambiguation), multiple people
David Best (disambiguation), multiple people
David Bianco (disambiguation), multiple people
David Bingham (disambiguation), multiple people
David Bird (disambiguation), multiple people
David Bishop (disambiguation), multiple people
David Black (disambiguation), multiple people
David Blackburn (disambiguation), multiple people
David Blair (disambiguation), multiple people
David Blue (disambiguation), multiple people
David Bond (disambiguation), multiple people
David Booth (disambiguation), multiple people
David Bowen (disambiguation), multiple people
David Bowman (disambiguation), multiple people
David Boyd (disambiguation), multiple people
David Boyle (disambiguation), multiple people
David Bradley (disambiguation), multiple people
David Braine (disambiguation), multiple people
David Brandon (disambiguation), multiple people
David Brandt (disambiguation), multiple people
David Bray (disambiguation), multiple people
David Brewer (disambiguation), multiple people
David Briggs (disambiguation), multiple people
David Bright (disambiguation), multiple people
David Brink (disambiguation), multiple people
David Brody (disambiguation), multiple people
David Brophy (disambiguation), multiple people
David Brooks (disambiguation), multiple people
David Brown (disambiguation), multiple people
David Bruton (disambiguation), multiple people
David Bryant (disambiguation), multiple people
David Buchanan (disambiguation), multiple people
David Bull (disambiguation), multiple people
David Burke (disambiguation), multiple people
David Burnet (disambiguation), multiple people
David Burns (disambiguation), multiple people
David Burton (disambiguation), multiple people
David Bush (disambiguation), multiple people
David Butler (disambiguation), multiple people
David Byrd (disambiguation), multiple people
David Byrne (disambiguation), multiple people

C
David Cain (disambiguation), multiple people
David Calder (disambiguation), multiple people
David Caldwell (disambiguation), multiple people
David Cameron (disambiguation), multiple people
David Campbell (disambiguation), multiple people
David Cannon (disambiguation), multiple people
David Cane (disambiguation), multiple people
David Carnegie (disambiguation), multiple people
David Carpenter (disambiguation), multiple people
David Carr (disambiguation), multiple people
David Carroll (disambiguation), multiple people
David Carson (disambiguation), multiple people
David Carter (disambiguation), multiple people
David Cass (disambiguation), multiple people
David Castillo (disambiguation), multiple people
David Chadwick (disambiguation), multiple people
David Chandler (disambiguation), multiple people
David Chang (disambiguation), multiple people
David Chapman (disambiguation), multiple people
David Charles (disambiguation), multiple people
David Chiu (disambiguation), multiple people
David Christian (disambiguation), multiple people
David Chu (disambiguation), multiple people
David Chung (disambiguation), multiple people
David Clark (disambiguation), multiple people
David Clarke (disambiguation), multiple people
David Clarkson (disambiguation), multiple people
David Clayton (disambiguation), multiple people
David Clements (disambiguation), multiple people
David Coates (disambiguation), multiple people
David Cobb (disambiguation), multiple people
David Coburn (disambiguation), multiple people
David Coe (disambiguation), multiple people
David Cohen (disambiguation), multiple people
David Cole (disambiguation), multiple people
David Coleman (disambiguation), multiple people
David Collier (disambiguation), multiple people
David Collins (disambiguation), multiple people
David Cook (disambiguation), multiple people
David Cooper (disambiguation), multiple people
David Coote (disambiguation), multiple people
David Copperfield (disambiguation), multiple people
David Corbett (disambiguation), multiple people
David Cortés (disambiguation), multiple people
David Coulter (disambiguation), multiple people
David Cousins (disambiguation), multiple people
David Cox (disambiguation), multiple people
David Crane (disambiguation), multiple people
David Crawford (disambiguation), multiple people
David Croft (disambiguation), multiple people
David Crosby (disambiguation), multiple people
David Cross (disambiguation), multiple people
David Crow (disambiguation), multiple people
David Crowe (disambiguation), multiple people
David Cullen (disambiguation), multiple people
David Cummings (disambiguation), multiple people
David Cunningham (disambiguation), multiple people
David Currie (disambiguation), multiple people
David Curtis (disambiguation), multiple people

D
David Dahl (disambiguation), multiple people
David Daly (disambiguation), multiple people
David Daniels (disambiguation), multiple people
David Darling (disambiguation), multiple people
David Darlow (disambiguation), multiple people
David Davidson (disambiguation), multiple people
David Davies (disambiguation), multiple people
David Davis (disambiguation), multiple people
David Dawson (disambiguation), multiple people
David Day (disambiguation), multiple people
David Demarest (disambiguation), multiple people
David Dempsey (disambiguation), multiple people
David Dennis (disambiguation), multiple people
David Dennison (disambiguation), multiple people
David de Rothschild (disambiguation), multiple people
David Devine (disambiguation), multiple people
David Diamond (disambiguation), multiple people
David Diaz (disambiguation), multiple people
David Dickinson (disambiguation), multiple people
David Dickson (disambiguation), multiple people
David Dixon (disambiguation), multiple people
David Dodd (disambiguation), multiple people
David Dodge (disambiguation), multiple people
David (disambiguation), multiple people
David Donaldson (disambiguation), multiple people
David Dorfman (disambiguation), multiple people
David Doty (disambiguation), multiple people
David Douglas (disambiguation), multiple people
David Douglass (disambiguation), multiple people
David Doyle (disambiguation), multiple people
David Drake (disambiguation), multiple people
David Drew (disambiguation), multiple people
David Drummond (disambiguation), multiple people
David Drury (disambiguation), multiple people
David Duggan (disambiguation), multiple people
David Duke (disambiguation), multiple people
David Duncan (disambiguation), multiple people
David Dunn (disambiguation), multiple people
David Durham (disambiguation), multiple people
David Dye (disambiguation), multiple people
David Dyson (disambiguation), multiple people

E
David Earl (disambiguation), multiple people
David Eccles (disambiguation), multiple people
David Edgar (disambiguation), multiple people
David Edmonds (disambiguation), multiple people
David Edwards (disambiguation), multiple people
David Einhorn (disambiguation), multiple people
David Eisner (disambiguation), multiple people
David Elliott (disambiguation), multiple people
David Ellis (disambiguation), multiple people
David Emanuel (disambiguation), multiple people
David Emmanuel (disambiguation), multiple people
David Engel (disambiguation), multiple people
David English (disambiguation), multiple people
David Epstein (disambiguation), multiple people
David Estrada (disambiguation), multiple people
David Evans (disambiguation), multiple people

F
David Faber (disambiguation), multiple people
David Fanning (disambiguation), multiple people
David Farrar (disambiguation), multiple people
David Farrell (disambiguation), multiple people
David Faulkner (disambiguation), multiple people
David Feinstein (disambiguation), multiple people
David Feldman (disambiguation), multiple people
David Ferguson (disambiguation), multiple people
David Fernández (disambiguation), multiple people
David Ferry (disambiguation), multiple people
David Fischer (disambiguation), multiple people
David Field (disambiguation), multiple people
David Finch (disambiguation), multiple people
David Finlay (disambiguation), multiple people
David Finley (disambiguation), multiple people
David Fisher (disambiguation), multiple people
David Fitzgerald (disambiguation), multiple people
David Fitzpatrick (disambiguation), multiple people
David Fleming (disambiguation), multiple people
David Fletcher (disambiguation), multiple people
David Flores (disambiguation), multiple people
David Flynn (disambiguation), multiple people
David Foley (disambiguation), multiple people
David Forbes (disambiguation), multiple people
David Ford (disambiguation), multiple people
David Foster (disambiguation), multiple people
David Fowler (disambiguation), multiple people
David Fox (disambiguation), multiple people
David Frank (disambiguation), multiple people
David Frankel (disambiguation), multiple people
David Franklin (disambiguation), multiple people
David Franks (disambiguation), multiple people
David Fraser (disambiguation), multiple people
David Freed (disambiguation), multiple people
David Freedman (disambiguation), multiple people
David Freeman (disambiguation), multiple people
David French (disambiguation), multiple people
David Friedman (disambiguation), multiple people
David Frost (disambiguation), multiple people
David Fry (disambiguation), multiple people
David Fulton (disambiguation), multiple people

G
David Galloway (disambiguation), multiple people
David Ganz (disambiguation), multiple people
David Garcia (disambiguation), multiple people
David Gardner (disambiguation), multiple people
David Garland (disambiguation), multiple people
David Garner (disambiguation), multiple people
David Garrett (disambiguation), multiple people
David Geaney (disambiguation), multiple people
David Geddes (disambiguation), multiple people
David George (disambiguation), multiple people
David Gibbs (disambiguation), multiple people
David Gibson (disambiguation), multiple people
David Gilbert (disambiguation), multiple people
David Gill (disambiguation), multiple people
David Gillespie (disambiguation), multiple people
David Ginsburg (disambiguation), multiple people
David Glass (disambiguation), multiple people
David Glover (disambiguation), multiple people
David Goldberg (disambiguation), multiple people
David Goldman (disambiguation), multiple people
David Gomez (disambiguation), multiple people
David Gonzalez (disambiguation), multiple people
David Goodall (disambiguation), multiple people
David Goode (disambiguation), multiple people
David Goodman (disambiguation), multiple people
David Gordon (disambiguation), multiple people
David Gore (disambiguation), multiple people
David Grace (disambiguation), multiple people
David Graham (disambiguation), multiple people
David Grant (disambiguation), multiple people
David Gray (disambiguation), multiple people
David Green (disambiguation), multiple people
David Greene (disambiguation), multiple people
David Gregory (disambiguation), multiple people
David Greig (disambiguation), multiple people
David Griffin (disambiguation), multiple people
David Griffith (disambiguation), multiple people
David Griggs (disambiguation), multiple people
David Grimes (disambiguation), multiple people
David Grimm (disambiguation), multiple people
David Gross (disambiguation), multiple people
David Grossman (disambiguation), multiple people
David Guest (disambiguation), multiple people
David Gunn (disambiguation), multiple people

H
David Haines (disambiguation), multiple people
David Hale (disambiguation), multiple people
David Hall (disambiguation), multiple people
David Hamilton (disambiguation), multiple people
David Hammond (disambiguation), multiple people
David Hancock (disambiguation), multiple people
David Harding (disambiguation), multiple people
David Harper (disambiguation), multiple people
David Harris (disambiguation), multiple people
David Harrison (disambiguation), multiple people
David Hart (disambiguation), multiple people
David Hartman (disambiguation), multiple people
David Harvey (disambiguation), multiple people
David Haskell (disambiguation), multiple people
David Hawk (disambiguation), multiple people
David Hawkins (disambiguation), multiple people
David Hayden (disambiguation), multiple people
David Hayes (disambiguation), multiple people
David Healy (disambiguation), multiple people
David Heath (disambiguation), multiple people
David Henderson (disambiguation), multiple people
David Henry (disambiguation), multiple people
David Herman (disambiguation), multiple people
David Hernandez (disambiguation), multiple people
David Heron (disambiguation), multiple people
David Hess (disambiguation), multiple people
David Hewitt (disambiguation), multiple people
David Heymann (disambiguation), multiple people
David Hibbard (disambiguation), multiple people
David Hickman (disambiguation), multiple people
David Hicks (disambiguation), multiple people
David Higgins (disambiguation), multiple people
David Hill (disambiguation), multiple people
David Hirst (disambiguation), multiple people
David Hobson (disambiguation), multiple people
David Hodge (disambiguation), multiple people
David Hodges (disambiguation), multiple people
David Hoffman (disambiguation), multiple people
David Hoffmann (disambiguation), multiple people
David Hogg (disambiguation), multiple people
David Holloway (disambiguation), multiple people
David Holmes (disambiguation), multiple people
David Holt (disambiguation), multiple people
David Hooper (disambiguation), multiple people
David Hopkins (disambiguation), multiple people
David Horowitz (disambiguation), multiple people
David Horton (disambiguation), multiple people
David Houle (disambiguation), multiple people
David House (disambiguation), multiple people
David Houston (disambiguation), multiple people
David Howard (disambiguation), multiple people
David Howell (disambiguation), multiple people
David Hoyle (disambiguation), multiple people
David Hubbard (disambiguation), multiple people
David Hudson (disambiguation), multiple people
David Huff (disambiguation), multiple people
David Hughes (disambiguation), multiple people
David Hull (disambiguation), multiple people
David Hulme (disambiguation), multiple people
David Humphreys (disambiguation), multiple people
David Hunt (disambiguation), multiple people
David Hunter (disambiguation), multiple people
David Hurwitz (disambiguation), multiple people
David Hutchinson (disambiguation), multiple people

I
David Ireland (disambiguation), multiple people
David Irving (disambiguation), multiple people
David Isaac (disambiguation), multiple people
David Isaacs (disambiguation), multiple people

J
David Jack (disambiguation), multiple people
David Jackson (disambiguation), multiple people
David Jacobs (disambiguation), multiple people
David Jacobson (disambiguation), multiple people
David James (disambiguation), multiple people
David Jamieson (disambiguation), multiple people
David Jay (disambiguation), multiple people
David Jefferson (disambiguation), multiple people
David Jenkins (disambiguation), multiple people
David Jennings (disambiguation), multiple people
David Jensen (disambiguation), multiple people
David Jimenez (disambiguation), multiple people
David John (disambiguation), multiple people
David Johnson (disambiguation), multiple people
David Johnston (disambiguation), multiple people
David Jones (disambiguation), multiple people
David Jordan (disambiguation), multiple people
David Joseph (disambiguation), multiple people
David Joy (disambiguation), multiple people
David Joyce (disambiguation), multiple people
David Judge (disambiguation), multiple people

K
David Kahn (disambiguation), multiple people
David Kaiser (disambiguation), multiple people
David Kane (disambiguation), multiple people
David Kang (disambiguation), multiple people
David Kaplan (disambiguation), multiple people 
David Karlsson (disambiguation), multiple people
David Katz (disambiguation), multiple people
David Kaufman (disambiguation), multiple people
David Kaye (disambiguation), multiple people
David Keane (disambiguation), multiple people
David Keenan (disambiguation), multiple people
David Keith (disambiguation), multiple people
David Kelley (disambiguation), multiple people
David Kelly (disambiguation), multiple people
David Kemp (disambiguation), multiple people
David Kennedy (disambiguation), multiple people
David Kenny (disambiguation), multiple people
David Kerr (disambiguation), multiple people
David Kessler (disambiguation), multiple people
David Key (disambiguation), multiple people
David Keys (disambiguation), multiple people
David Kilcoyne (disambiguation), multiple people
David Kim (disambiguation), multiple people
David King (disambiguation), multiple people
David Kirby (disambiguation), multiple people
David Kirk (disambiguation), multiple people
David Kirkpatrick (disambiguation), multiple people
David Klein (disambiguation), multiple people
David Knight (disambiguation), multiple people
David Knowles (disambiguation), multiple people
David Knox (disambiguation), multiple people
David Kramer (disambiguation), multiple people

L
David Lake (disambiguation), multiple people
David Lale (disambiguation), multiple people
David Lam (disambiguation), multiple people
David Lamb (disambiguation), multiple people
David Lambert (disambiguation), multiple people
David Lancaster (disambiguation), multiple people
David Lane (disambiguation), multiple people
David Lang (disambiguation), multiple people
David Latta (disambiguation), multiple people
David Law (disambiguation), multiple people
David Lawrence (disambiguation), multiple people
David Lawson (disambiguation), multiple people
David Leach (disambiguation), multiple people
David Leadbetter (disambiguation), multiple people
David Lee (disambiguation), multiple people
David Leland (disambiguation), multiple people
David Lemieux (disambiguation), multiple people
David Leon (disambiguation), multiple people
David Leonard (disambiguation), multiple people
David Lester (disambiguation), multiple people
David Levene (disambiguation), multiple people
David Levi (disambiguation), multiple people
David Levin (disambiguation), multiple people
David Levine (disambiguation), multiple people
David Levy (disambiguation), multiple people
David Lewis (disambiguation), multiple people
David Li (disambiguation), multiple people
David Lim (disambiguation), multiple people
David Lindberg (disambiguation), multiple people
David Lindley (disambiguation), multiple people
David Lindsay (disambiguation), multiple people
David Little (disambiguation), multiple people
David Livingstone (disambiguation), multiple people
David Lloyd (disambiguation), multiple people
David Locke (disambiguation), multiple people
David Lodge (disambiguation), multiple people
David Loeb (disambiguation), multiple people
David Logan (disambiguation), multiple people
David Long (disambiguation), multiple people
David López (disambiguation), multiple people
David Lord (disambiguation), multiple people
David Louie (disambiguation), multiple people
David Love (disambiguation), multiple people
David Lowery (disambiguation), multiple people
David Lucas (disambiguation), multiple people
David Ludwig (disambiguation), multiple people
David Lumsden (disambiguation), multiple people
David Lynch (disambiguation), multiple people
David Lynn (disambiguation), multiple people
David Lyons (disambiguation), multiple people

M
David MacDonald (disambiguation), multiple people
David Mack (disambiguation), multiple people
David MacKenzie (disambiguation), multiple people
David Macpherson (disambiguation), multiple people
David Madden (disambiguation), multiple people
David Mahoney (disambiguation), multiple people
David Main (disambiguation), multiple people
David Mallet (disambiguation), multiple people
David Malone (disambiguation), multiple people
David Mandelbaum (disambiguation), multiple people
David Mann (disambiguation), multiple people
David Manning (disambiguation), multiple people
David Manson (disambiguation), multiple people
David Marcus (disambiguation), multiple people
David Marks (disambiguation), multiple people
David Marquez (disambiguation), multiple people
David Marsh (disambiguation), multiple people
David Marshall (disambiguation), multiple people
David Martin (disambiguation), multiple people
David Mason (disambiguation), multiple people
David Matheson (disambiguation), multiple people
David Matthews (disambiguation), multiple people
David Maxwell (disambiguation), multiple people
David May (disambiguation), multiple people
David McAllister (disambiguation), multiple people
David McCabe (disambiguation), multiple people
David McCarthy (disambiguation), multiple people
David McClain (disambiguation), multiple people
David McDonald (disambiguation), multiple people
David McFadden (disambiguation), multiple people
David McFarlane (disambiguation), multiple people
David McGill (disambiguation), multiple people
David McGowan (disambiguation), multiple people
David McIntosh (disambiguation), multiple people
David McKay (disambiguation), multiple people
David McKean (disambiguation), multiple people
David McKenna (disambiguation), multiple people
David McKinney (disambiguation), multiple people
David McLean (disambiguation), multiple people
David McLellan (disambiguation), multiple people
David McMillan (disambiguation), multiple people
David McNally (disambiguation), multiple people
David McSweeney (disambiguation), multiple people
David McWilliams (disambiguation), multiple people
David Mead (disambiguation), multiple people
David Mejia (disambiguation), multiple people
David Mellor (disambiguation), multiple people
David Meltzer (disambiguation), multiple people
David Melville (disambiguation), multiple people
David Mercer (disambiguation), multiple people
David Merrill (disambiguation), multiple people
David Meyers (disambiguation), multiple people
David Michael (disambiguation), multiple people
David Michel (disambiguation), multiple people
David Miles (disambiguation), multiple people
David Miller (disambiguation), multiple people
David Mills (disambiguation), multiple people
David Mims (disambiguation), multiple people
David Miner (disambiguation), multiple people
David Miranda (disambiguation), multiple people
David Mitchell (disambiguation), multiple people
David Moberg (disambiguation), multiple people
David Mobley (disambiguation), multiple people
David Monson (disambiguation), multiple people
David Montgomery (disambiguation), multiple people
David Moody (disambiguation), multiple people
David Moon (disambiguation), multiple people
David Moore (disambiguation), multiple people
David Morales (disambiguation), multiple people
David Morgan (disambiguation), multiple people
David Morrell (disambiguation), multiple people
David Morris (disambiguation), multiple people
David Morse (disambiguation), multiple people
David Moss (disambiguation), multiple people
David Mullen (disambiguation), multiple people
David Muller (disambiguation), multiple people
David Mullins (disambiguation), multiple people
David Muñoz (disambiguation), multiple people
David Munson (disambiguation), multiple people
David Murphy (disambiguation), multiple people
David Murray (disambiguation), multiple people
David Myers (disambiguation), multiple people
David Myles (disambiguation), multiple people

N
David Napier (disambiguation), multiple people
David Nash (disambiguation), multiple people
David Nathan (disambiguation), multiple people
David Navarro (disambiguation), multiple people
David Neal (disambiguation), multiple people
David Nelson (disambiguation), multiple people
David Neville (disambiguation), multiple people
David Newell (disambiguation), multiple people
David Newman (disambiguation), multiple people
David Newton (disambiguation), multiple people
David Nicholas (disambiguation), multiple people
David Nicholls (disambiguation), multiple people
David Nichols (disambiguation), multiple people
David Nicholson (disambiguation), multiple people
David Nilsson (disambiguation), multiple people
David Nixon (disambiguation), multiple people
David Noble (disambiguation), multiple people
David Nolan (disambiguation), multiple people
David Noonan (disambiguation), multiple people
David Norman (disambiguation), multiple people
David Norris (disambiguation), multiple people
David North (disambiguation), multiple people
David Norton (disambiguation), multiple people
David Novak (disambiguation), multiple people
David Nunn (disambiguation), multiple people
David Nye (disambiguation), multiple people

O
David O'Brien (disambiguation), multiple people
David O'Connell (disambiguation), multiple people
David O'Connor (disambiguation), multiple people
David Ogilby (disambiguation), multiple people
David Ogilvy (disambiguation), multiple people
David O'Keefe (disambiguation), multiple people
David Oliver (disambiguation), multiple people
David Olsen (disambiguation), multiple people
David Oppenheim (disambiguation), multiple people
David O'Reilly (disambiguation), multiple people
David Orr (disambiguation), multiple people
David Orton (disambiguation), multiple people
David Osborne (disambiguation), multiple people
David O'Sullivan (disambiguation), multiple people
David Overton (disambiguation), multiple people
David Owen (disambiguation), multiple people
David Oxtoby (disambiguation), multiple people

P
David Packer (disambiguation), multiple people
David Padilla (disambiguation), multiple people
David Palmer (disambiguation), multiple people
David Park (disambiguation), multiple people
David Parker (disambiguation), multiple people
David Parkes (disambiguation), multiple people
David Parks (disambiguation), multiple people
David Parry (disambiguation), multiple people
David Paterson (disambiguation), multiple people
David Patrick (disambiguation), multiple people
David Patten (disambiguation), multiple people
David Patterson (disambiguation), multiple people
David Patton (disambiguation), multiple people
David Paul (disambiguation), multiple people
David Paulsen (disambiguation), multiple people
David Paulson (disambiguation), multiple people
David Payne (disambiguation), multiple people
David Peacock (disambiguation), multiple people
David Pearce (disambiguation), multiple people
David Pearl (disambiguation), multiple people
David Pearson (disambiguation), multiple people
David Peel (disambiguation), multiple people
David Pérez (disambiguation), multiple people
David Perkins (disambiguation), multiple people
David Perry (disambiguation), multiple people
David Peters (disambiguation), multiple people
David Petersen (disambiguation), multiple people
David Peterson (disambiguation), multiple people
David Phelps (disambiguation), multiple people
David Phillips (disambiguation), multiple people
David Pierce (disambiguation), multiple people
David Pimentel (disambiguation), multiple people
David Pine (disambiguation), multiple people
David Piper (disambiguation), multiple people
David Platt (disambiguation), multiple people
David Poisson (disambiguation), multiple people
David Pollock (disambiguation), multiple people
David Pollard (disambiguation), multiple people
David Poole (disambiguation), multiple people
David Pope (disambiguation), multiple people
David Porter (disambiguation), multiple people
David Pratt (disambiguation), multiple people
David Preece (disambiguation), multiple people
David Price (disambiguation), multiple people
David Prior (disambiguation), multiple people
David Pritchard (disambiguation), multiple people
David Prosser (disambiguation), multiple people
David Prowse (disambiguation), multiple people
David Pugh (disambiguation), multiple people
David Pye (disambiguation), multiple people

Q
David Quinn (disambiguation), multiple people

R
David Ramírez (disambiguation), multiple people
David Ramsay (disambiguation), multiple people
David Ramsey (disambiguation), multiple people
David Rankin (disambiguation), multiple people
David Rappaport (disambiguation), multiple people
David Ray (disambiguation), multiple people
David Rea (disambiguation), multiple people
David Read (disambiguation), multiple people
David Reed (disambiguation), multiple people
David Rees (disambiguation), multiple people
David Reese (disambiguation), multiple people
David Reich (disambiguation), multiple people
David Reid (disambiguation), multiple people
David Reidy (disambiguation), multiple people
David Reiss (disambiguation), multiple people
David Reuben (disambiguation), multiple people
David Reynolds (disambiguation), multiple people
David Rhodes (disambiguation), multiple people
David Rice (disambiguation), multiple people
David Richards (disambiguation), multiple people
David Richardson (disambiguation), multiple people
David Riley (disambiguation), multiple people
David Ritchie (disambiguation), multiple people
David Robbins (disambiguation), multiple people
David Roberts (disambiguation), multiple people
David Robertson (disambiguation), multiple people
David Robinson (disambiguation), multiple people
David Rodgers (disambiguation), multiple people
David Rodriguez (disambiguation), multiple people
David Rogers (disambiguation), multiple people
David Rolfe (disambiguation), multiple people
David Romero (disambiguation), multiple people
David Rose (disambiguation), multiple people
David Rosen (disambiguation), multiple people
David Ross (disambiguation), multiple people
David Roth (disambiguation), multiple people
David Rothenberg (disambiguation), multiple people
David Rowe (disambiguation), multiple people
David Rowland (disambiguation), multiple people
David Roy (disambiguation), multiple people
David Royle (disambiguation), multiple people
David Rubenstein (disambiguation), multiple people
David Rubin (disambiguation), multiple people
David Rubinstein (disambiguation), multiple people
David Rudolph (disambiguation), multiple people
David Rumsey (disambiguation), multiple people
David Rush (disambiguation), multiple people
David Russell (disambiguation), multiple people
David Russo (disambiguation), multiple people
David Rutherford (disambiguation), multiple people
David Ryan (disambiguation), multiple people

S
David Salazar (disambiguation), multiple people
David Salmon (disambiguation), multiple people
David Sampson (disambiguation), multiple people
David Samson (disambiguation), multiple people
David Samuel (disambiguation), multiple people
David Samuels (disambiguation), multiple people
David Sánchez (disambiguation), multiple people
David Sanders (disambiguation), multiple people
David Sanford (disambiguation), multiple people
David Sanger (disambiguation), multiple people
David Saperstein (disambiguation), multiple people
David Sassoon (disambiguation), multiple people
David Sayer (disambiguation), multiple people
David Schofield (disambiguation), multiple people
David Schneider (disambiguation), multiple people
David Schramm (disambiguation), multiple people
David Schroeder (disambiguation), multiple people
David Schultz (disambiguation), multiple people
David Schumacher (disambiguation), multiple people
David Schwartz (disambiguation), multiple people
David Scott (disambiguation), multiple people
David Sears (disambiguation), multiple people
David Segal (disambiguation), multiple people
David Seymour (disambiguation), multiple people
David Shafer (disambiguation), multiple people
David Shapiro (disambiguation), multiple people
David Sharp (disambiguation), multiple people
David Sharpe (disambiguation), multiple people
David Shaw (disambiguation), multiple people
David Shepherd (disambiguation), multiple people
David Sheridan (disambiguation), multiple people
David Sibley (disambiguation), multiple people
David Siegel (disambiguation), multiple people
David Silva (disambiguation), multiple people
David Silver (disambiguation), multiple people
David Silverman (disambiguation), multiple people
David Simmons (disambiguation), multiple people
David Simon (disambiguation), multiple people
David Simons (disambiguation), multiple people
David Simpson (disambiguation), multiple people
David Sims (disambiguation), multiple people
David Sinclair (disambiguation), multiple people
David Singer (disambiguation), multiple people
David Singh (disambiguation), multiple people
David Six (disambiguation), multiple people
David Skinner (disambiguation), multiple people
David Slater (disambiguation), multiple people
David Smith (disambiguation), multiple people
David Smyth (disambiguation), multiple people 
David Snell (disambiguation), multiple people
David Snow (disambiguation), multiple people
David Solomon (disambiguation), multiple people
David Soren (disambiguation), multiple people
David Spector (disambiguation), multiple people
David Spence (disambiguation), multiple people
David Spencer (disambiguation), multiple people
David Spicer (disambiguation), multiple people
David Stafford (disambiguation), multiple people
David Stahl (disambiguation), multiple people
David Stark (disambiguation), multiple people
David Starr (disambiguation), multiple people
David Steele (disambiguation), multiple people
David Stein (disambiguation), multiple people
David Steinberg (disambiguation), multiple people
David Steiner (disambiguation), multiple people
David Steinmetz (disambiguation), multiple people
David Stephens (disambiguation), multiple people
David Stephenson (disambiguation), multiple people
David Stevens (disambiguation), multiple people
David Stevenson (disambiguation), multiple people
David Stewart (disambiguation), multiple people
David Stirling (disambiguation), multiple people
David Stone (disambiguation), multiple people
David Stuart (disambiguation), multiple people
David Sullivan (disambiguation), multiple people
David Summers (disambiguation), multiple people
David Sun (disambiguation), multiple people
David Suter (disambiguation), multiple people
David Sutton (disambiguation), multiple people
David Sweet (disambiguation), multiple people
David Swift (disambiguation), multiple people
David Sykes (disambiguation), multiple people
David Syme (disambiguation), multiple people

T
David Tanner (disambiguation), multiple people
David Tate (disambiguation), multiple people
David Taylor (disambiguation), multiple people
David Teague (disambiguation), multiple people
David Tennant (disambiguation), multiple people
David Terrell (disambiguation), multiple people
David Terry (disambiguation), multiple people
David Thomas (disambiguation), multiple people
David Thompson (disambiguation), multiple people
David Thomson (disambiguation), multiple people
David Thorburn (disambiguation), multiple people
David Thorne (disambiguation), multiple people
David Thorpe (disambiguation), multiple people
David Thornton (disambiguation), multiple people
David Todd (disambiguation), multiple people
David Tomlinson (disambiguation), multiple people
David Tong (disambiguation), multiple people
David Torrance (disambiguation), multiple people
David Townsend (disambiguation), multiple people
David Tucker (disambiguation), multiple people
David Turner (disambiguation), multiple people
David Turpin (disambiguation), multiple people
David Twersky (disambiguation), multiple people
David Tyler (disambiguation), multiple people
David Tyrrell (disambiguation), multiple people

U
David Unger (disambiguation), multiple people
David Urquhart (disambiguation), multiple people

V
David Valentine (disambiguation), multiple people
David Vance (disambiguation), multiple people
David Vaněček (disambiguation), multiple people
David Vann (disambiguation), multiple people
David Vaughan (disambiguation), multiple people
David Vaughn (disambiguation), multiple people
David Vincent (disambiguation), multiple people
David Vogel (disambiguation), multiple people

W
David Wade (disambiguation), multiple people
David Wagner (disambiguation), multiple people
David Wakefield (disambiguation), multiple people
David Wales (disambiguation), multiple people
David Walker (disambiguation), multiple people
David Wall (disambiguation), multiple people
David Wallace (disambiguation), multiple people
David Waller (disambiguation), multiple people
David Walsh (disambiguation), multiple people
David Walter (disambiguation), multiple people
David Walton (disambiguation), multiple people
David Wang (disambiguation), multiple people
David Ward (disambiguation), multiple people
David Ware (disambiguation), multiple people
David Warner (disambiguation), multiple people
David Warren (disambiguation), multiple people
David Waters (disambiguation), multiple people
David Watkin (disambiguation), multiple people
David Watkins (disambiguation), multiple people
David Watson (disambiguation), multiple people
David Watt (disambiguation), multiple people
David Watters (disambiguation), multiple people
David Watts (disambiguation), multiple people
David Wayne (disambiguation), multiple people
David Weber (disambiguation), multiple people
David Webster (disambiguation), multiple people
David Weinstein (disambiguation), multiple people
David Weintraub (disambiguation), multiple people
David Weir (disambiguation), multiple people
David Weiss (disambiguation), multiple people
David Wellington (disambiguation), multiple people
David Wells (disambiguation), multiple people
David Wemyss (disambiguation), multiple people
David Werner (disambiguation), multiple people
David West (disambiguation), multiple people
David Wexler (disambiguation), multiple people
David Wheatley (disambiguation), multiple people
David Wheeler (disambiguation), multiple people
David Whitaker (disambiguation), multiple people
David Whittaker (disambiguation), multiple people
David White (disambiguation), multiple people
David Whiteman (disambiguation), multiple people
David Wight (disambiguation), multiple people
David Wightman (disambiguation), multiple people
David Wilcox (disambiguation), multiple people
David Wilder (disambiguation), multiple people
David Wiley (disambiguation), multiple people
David Wilkie (disambiguation), multiple people
David Wilkins (disambiguation), multiple people
David Willey (disambiguation), multiple people
David Williams (disambiguation), multiple people
David Williamson (disambiguation), multiple people
David Willis (disambiguation), multiple people
David Wills (disambiguation), multiple people
David Willson (disambiguation), multiple people
David Wilson (disambiguation), multiple people
David Wingate (disambiguation), multiple people
David Winner (disambiguation), multiple people
David Winter (disambiguation), multiple people
David Winters (disambiguation), multiple people
David Wise (disambiguation), multiple people
David Wohl (disambiguation), multiple people
David Wolf (disambiguation), multiple people
David Wolfe (disambiguation), multiple people
David Wong (disambiguation), multiple people
David Wood (disambiguation), multiple people
David Woods (disambiguation), multiple people
David Woodward (disambiguation), multiple people
David Worth (disambiguation), multiple people
David Wotherspoon (disambiguation), multiple people
David Wrench (disambiguation), multiple people 
David Wright (disambiguation), multiple people
David Wu (disambiguation), multiple people
David Wyatt (disambiguation), multiple people
David Wynne (disambiguation), multiple people

Y
David Yaffe (disambiguation), multiple people
David Yates (disambiguation), multiple people
David Yelland (disambiguation), multiple people
David Yost (disambiguation), multiple people
David Young (disambiguation), multiple people

Z
David Zimmer (disambiguation), multiple people
David Zimmerman (disambiguation), multiple people
David Zuckerman (disambiguation), multiple people

Fictional characters 
David, a character in the 1967 coming-of-age novel The Outsiders
David, a character played by Willie Aames in the 1982 Canadian adventure romance movie Paradise
David, a human character on Sesame Street from 1971 to 1989, played by Northern Calloway
David of Sassoun, Armenian epic hero
David 8, an android in the Alien movie franchise
David Addison, a character played by Bruce Willis in the television series Moonlighting
David Brent, the protagonist of The Office
David Brookes, a character in the TV sitcom The Ropers
David Freeman, the main character in the 1986 American science fiction adventure movie Flight of the Navigator
David Goodson, one of the two main characters in the 1994 American drama TV movie David's Mother
David Hogan, a character in the American sitcom television series The Hogan Family
David Innes, the protagonist of Edgar Rice Burroughs' Pellucidar novels 
David "Dave" McFly, a character in the Back to the Future movie series
David Marcus, a character in the 1984 American science fiction film Star Trek III: The Search for Spock
David Platt, character in British soap opera Coronation Street
David Leonard Read, character in the Arthur book and television series
David Rossi, a main character in the TV series Criminal Minds
David Seville, the producer and manager of the band Alvin and the Chipmunks, and the adoptive father of Alvin, Simon, and Theodre

David Silver, a character in the American teen drama television series Beverly Hills 90210
David Singh, character from DC Comics
David Telford, a recurring character in Stargate Universe
David Wallace, CEO of Dunder Mifflin on the US TV series The Office
David Xanatos, one of the main antagonists, turned ally in the animated series Gargoyles
David, a vampire from the film The Lost Boys

See also 
 Wikipedia articles whose title starts with David

David